= Neolithic British Isles =

British, Irish and Manx history c. 4100–2500 BC

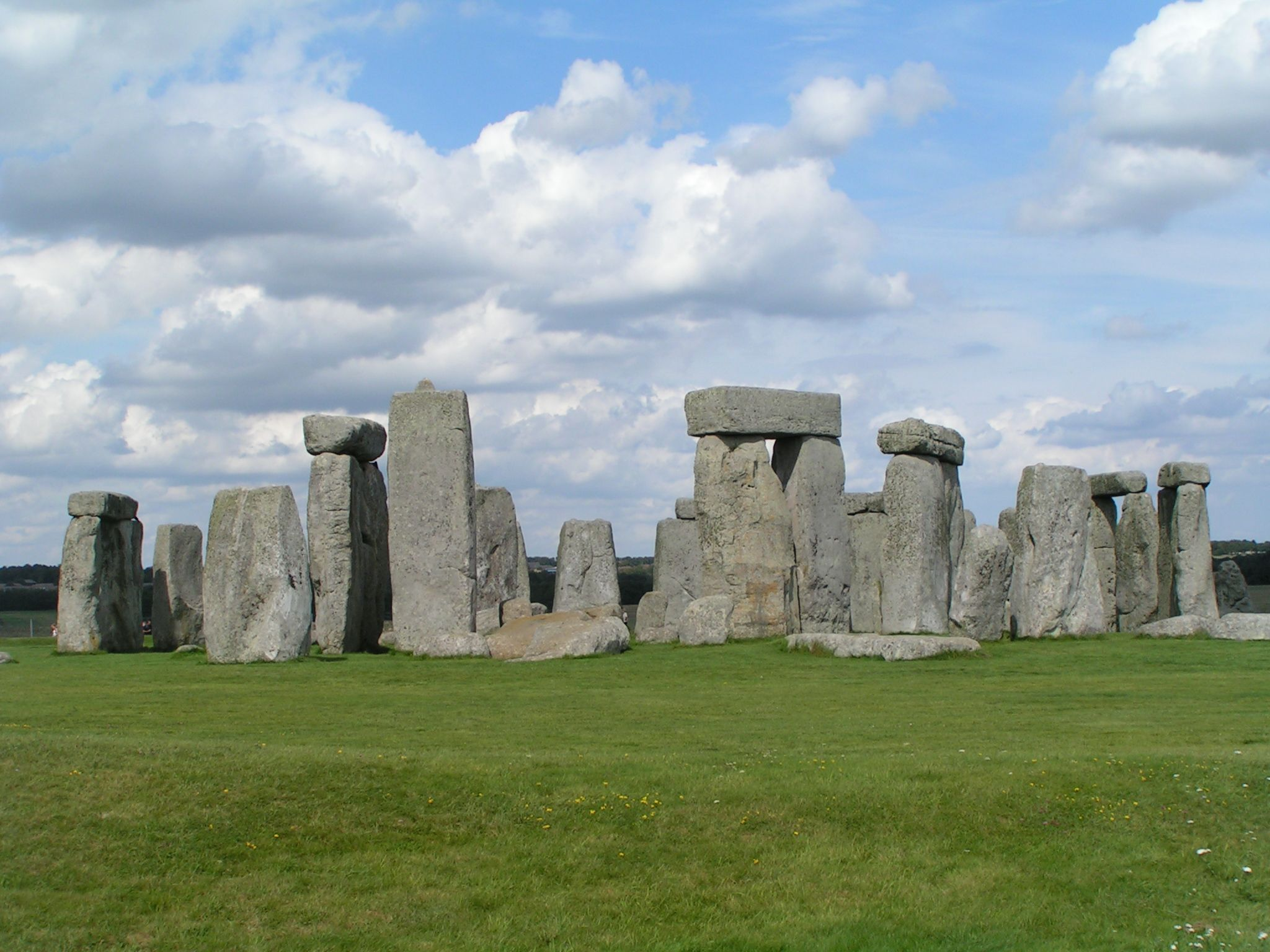
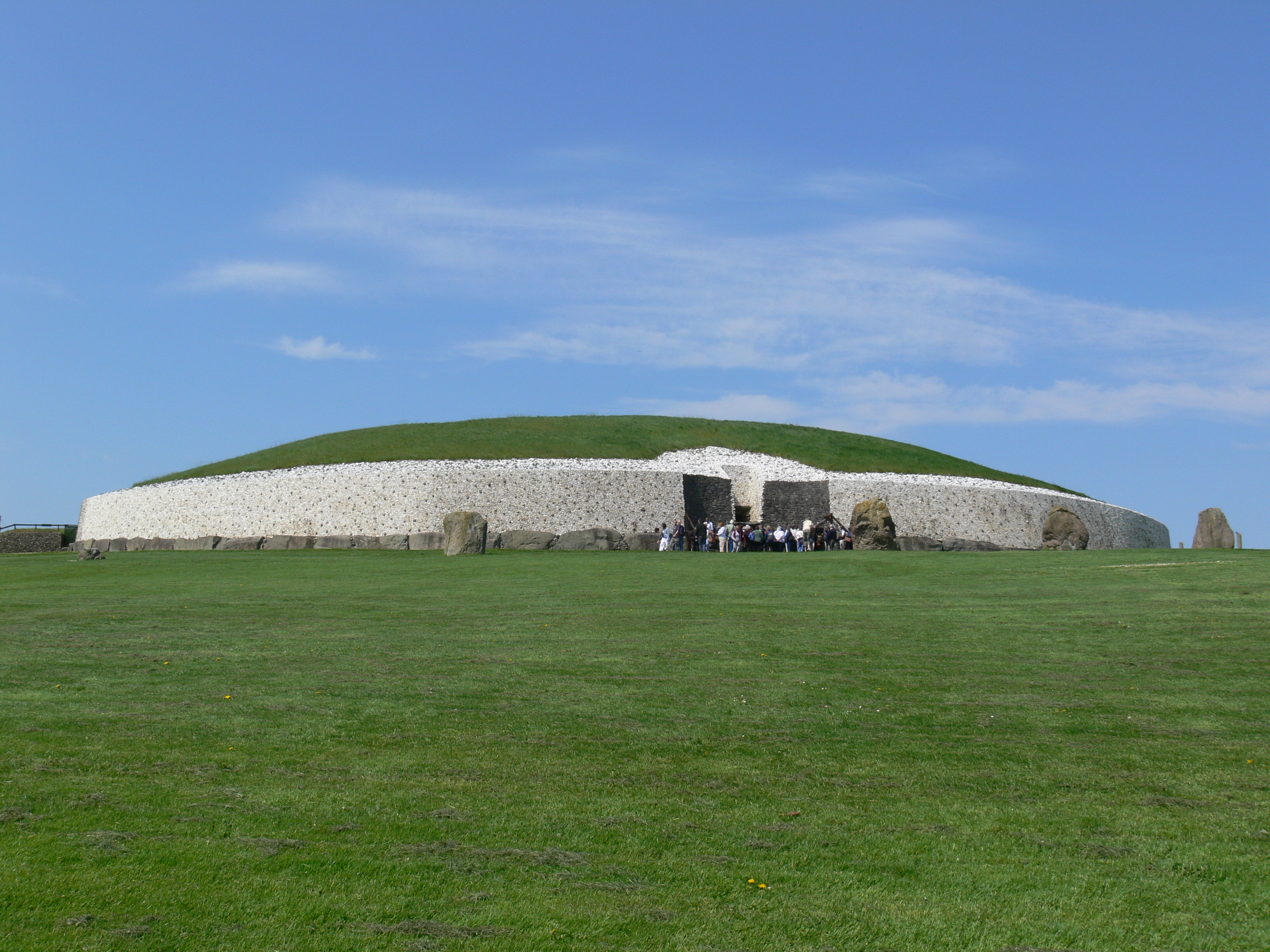
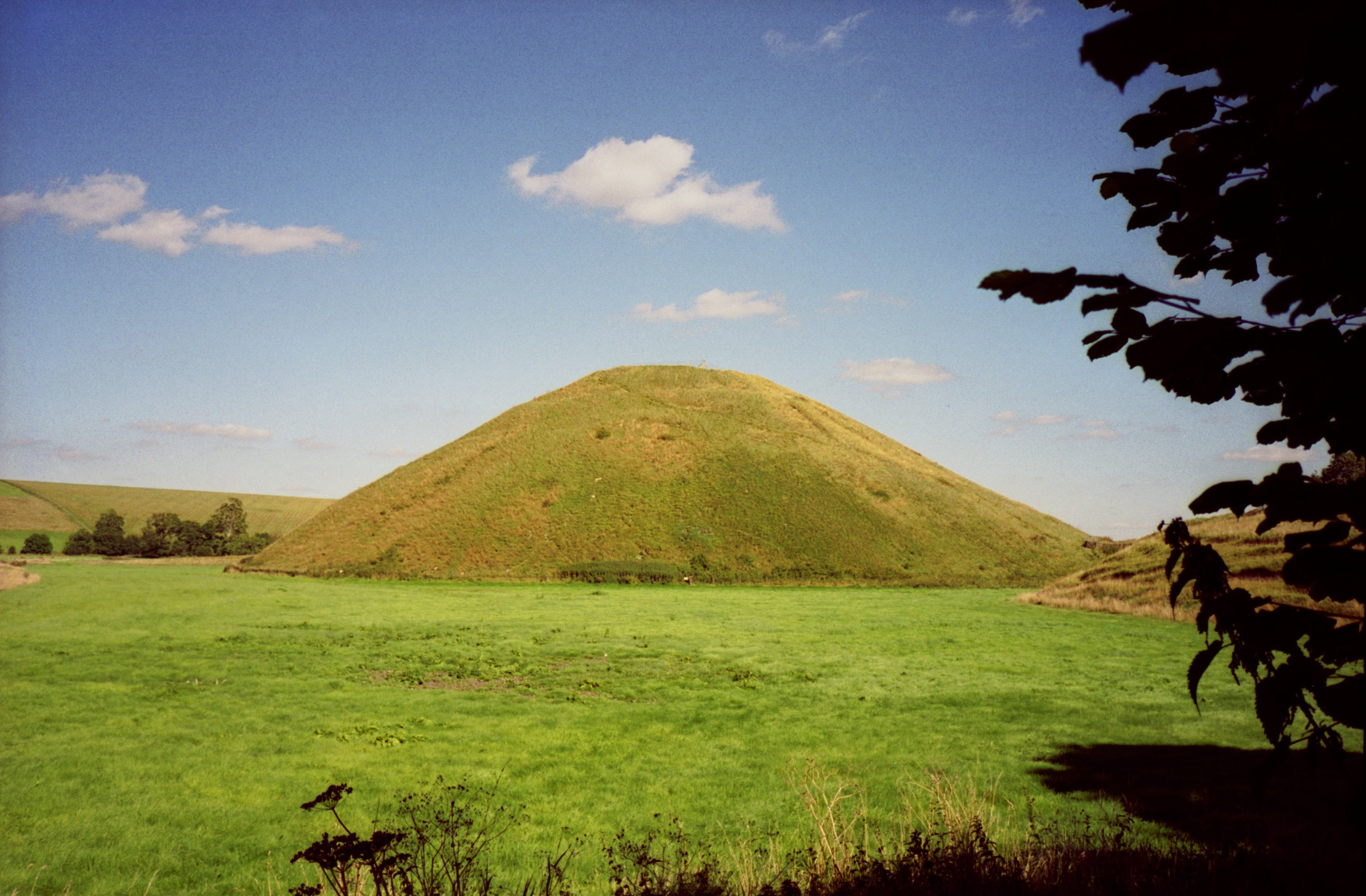
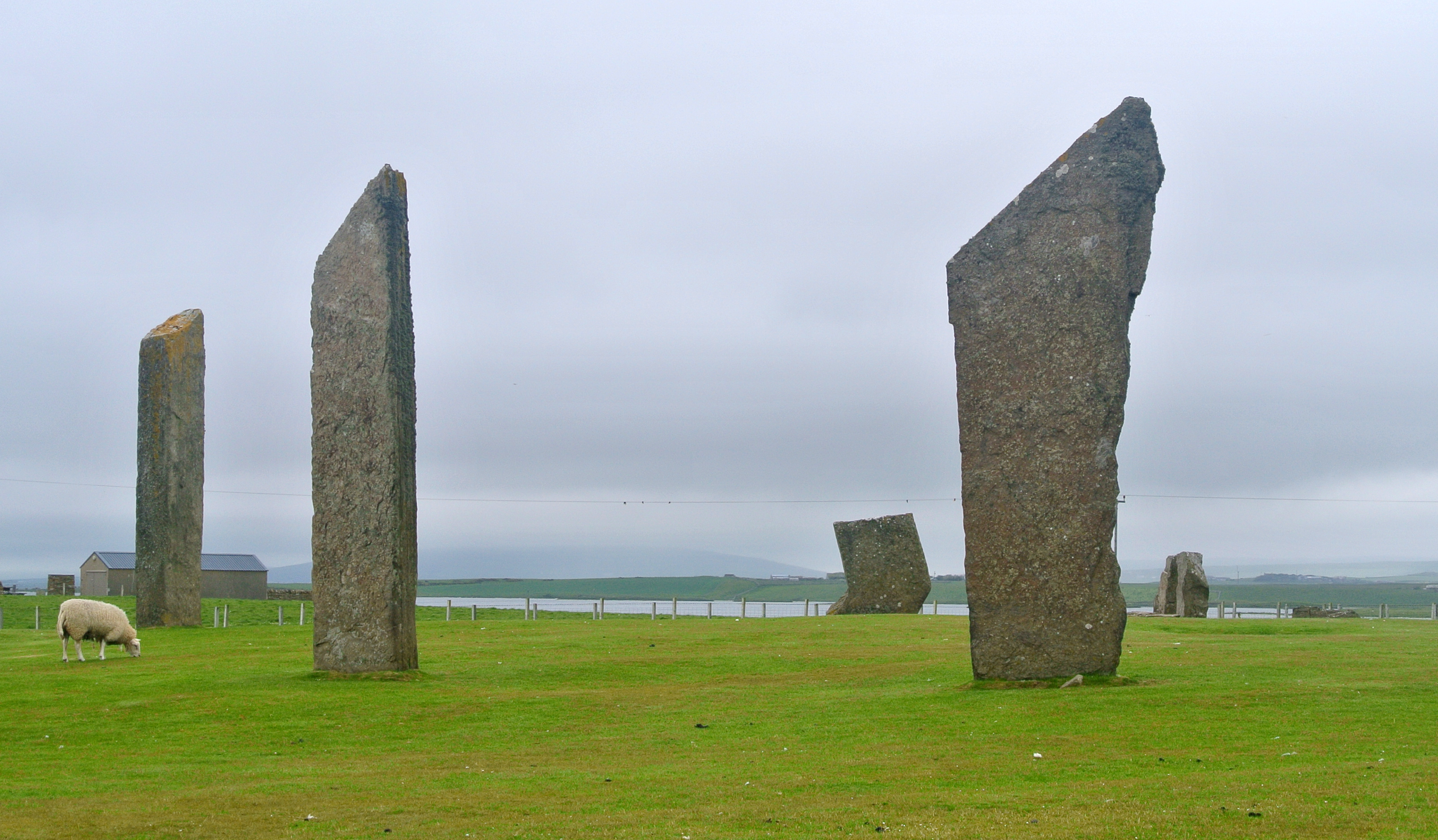
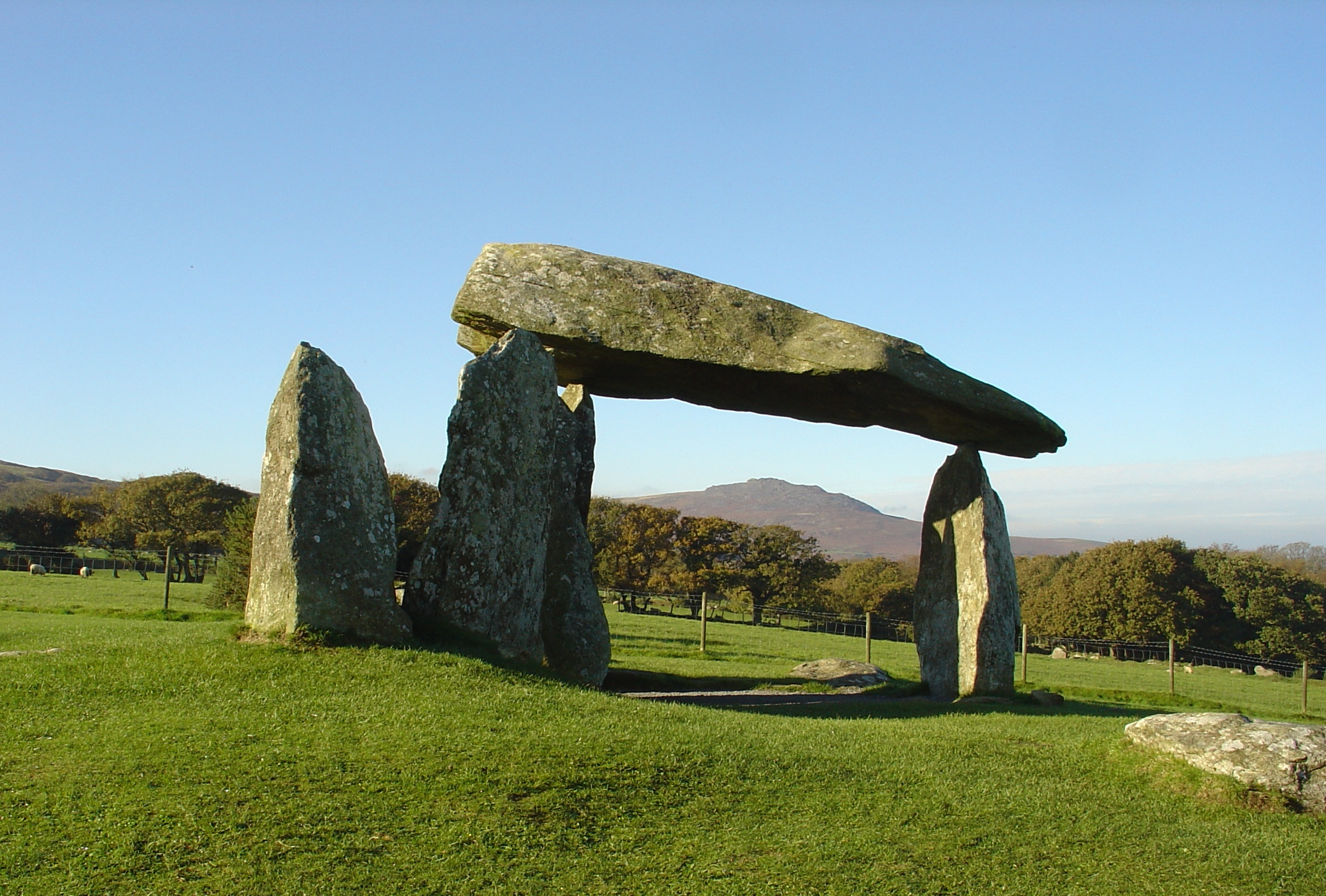
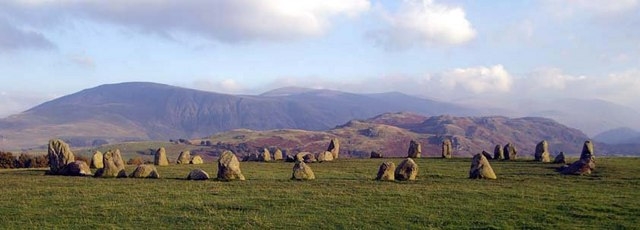
- Stonehenge Newgrange Silbury Hill Standing Stones of Stenness Pentre Ifan Castlerigg stone circle
- Geographical range: British Isles
- Period: Neolithic
- Dates: c. 4100 — c. 2500 BC
- Preceded by: Neolithic Brittany, Mesolithic Britain, Mesolithic Ireland
- Followed by: Bell Beaker culture, Bronze Age Britain, Bronze Age Ireland

The Neolithic period in the British Isles lasted from c. 4100 to c. 2,500 BC. Constituting the final stage of the Stone Age in the region, it was preceded by the Mesolithic and followed by the Bronze Age.

During the Mesolithic period, the inhabitants of the British Isles had been hunter-gatherers. Around 4000 BC, migrants began arriving from Central Europe. These migrants brought new ideas, leading to a radical transformation of society and landscape that has been called the Neolithic Revolution. The Neolithic period in the British Isles was characterised by the adoption of agriculture and sedentary living. To make room for the new farmland, the early agricultural communities undertook mass deforestation across the islands, which dramatically and permanently transformed the landscape. At the same time, new types of stone tools requiring more skill began to be produced, and new technologies included polishing. Although the earliest indisputably-acknowledged languages spoken in the British Isles belonged to the Celtic branch of the Indo-European family, it is not known what language the early farming people spoke.

The Neolithic also saw the construction of a wide variety of monuments in the landscape, many of which were megalithic in nature. The earliest of them are the chambered tombs of the Early Neolithic, but in the Late Neolithic, this form of monumentalization was replaced by the construction of stone circles, a trend that would continue into the following Bronze Age. Those constructions are taken to reflect ideological changes, with new ideas about religion, ritual and social hierarchy.

The Neolithic people in Europe were not literate and so they left behind no written record that modern historians can study. All that is known about this time period in Europe comes from archaeological investigations. These were begun by the antiquarians of the 18th century and intensified in the 19th century during which John Lubbock coined the term "Neolithic". In the 20th and the 21st centuries, further excavation and synthesis went ahead, dominated by figures like V. Gordon Childe, Stuart Piggott, Julian Thomas and Richard Bradley.

== Historical overview ==
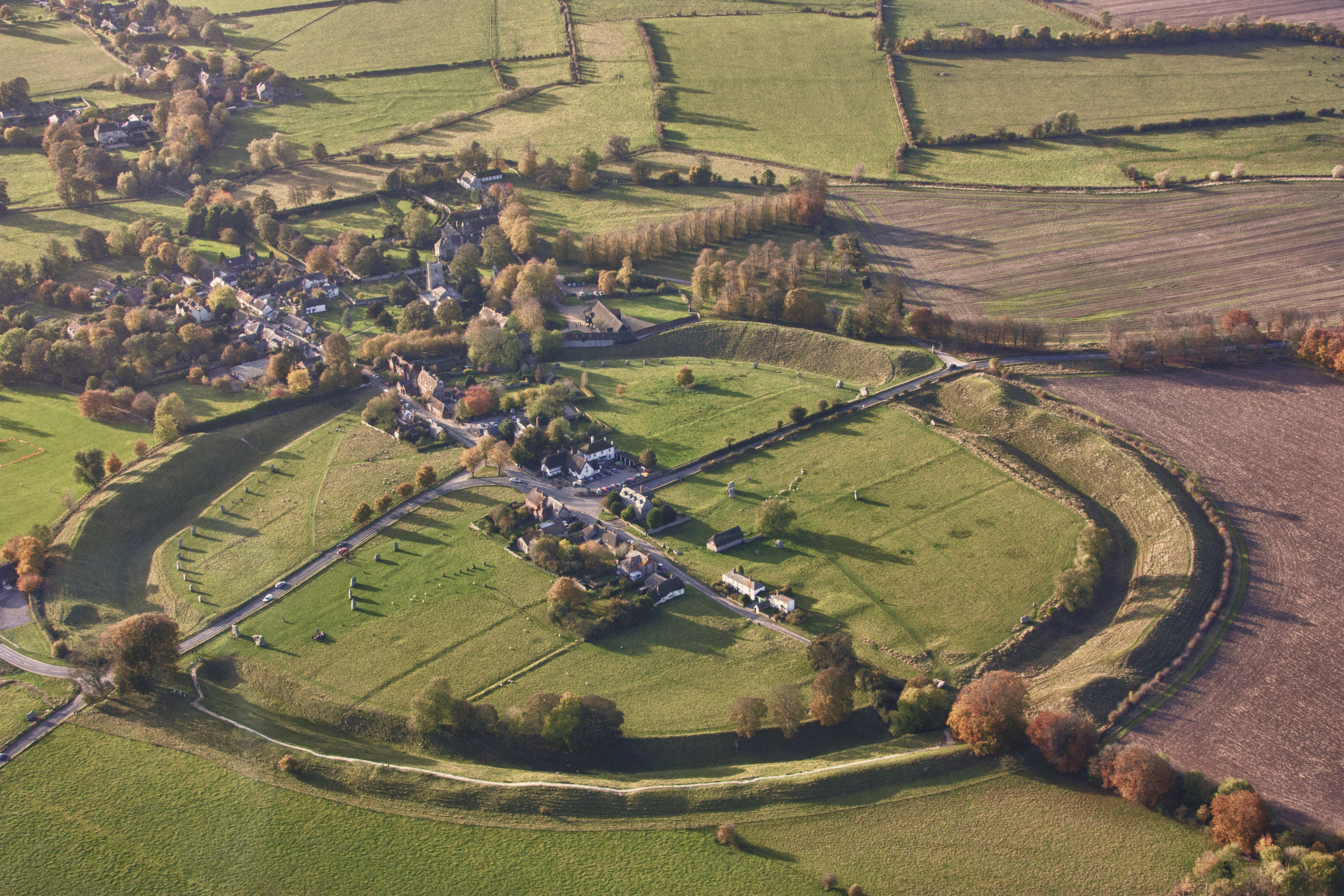
Avebury, Wiltshire, England, c. 3000–2600 BC

=== Late Mesolithic ===
The period that preceded the Neolithic in the British Isles is known by archaeologists as the Mesolithic. During the early part of that period, Britain was still attached by the landmass of Doggerland to the rest of Continental Europe. The archaeologist and prehistorian Caroline Malone noted that during the Late Mesolithic, the British Isles were something of a "technological backwater" in European terms and were still living as a hunter-gatherer society though most of Southern Europe had already taken up agriculture and sedentary living.

=== Early and Middle Neolithic: 4000–2900 BC ===
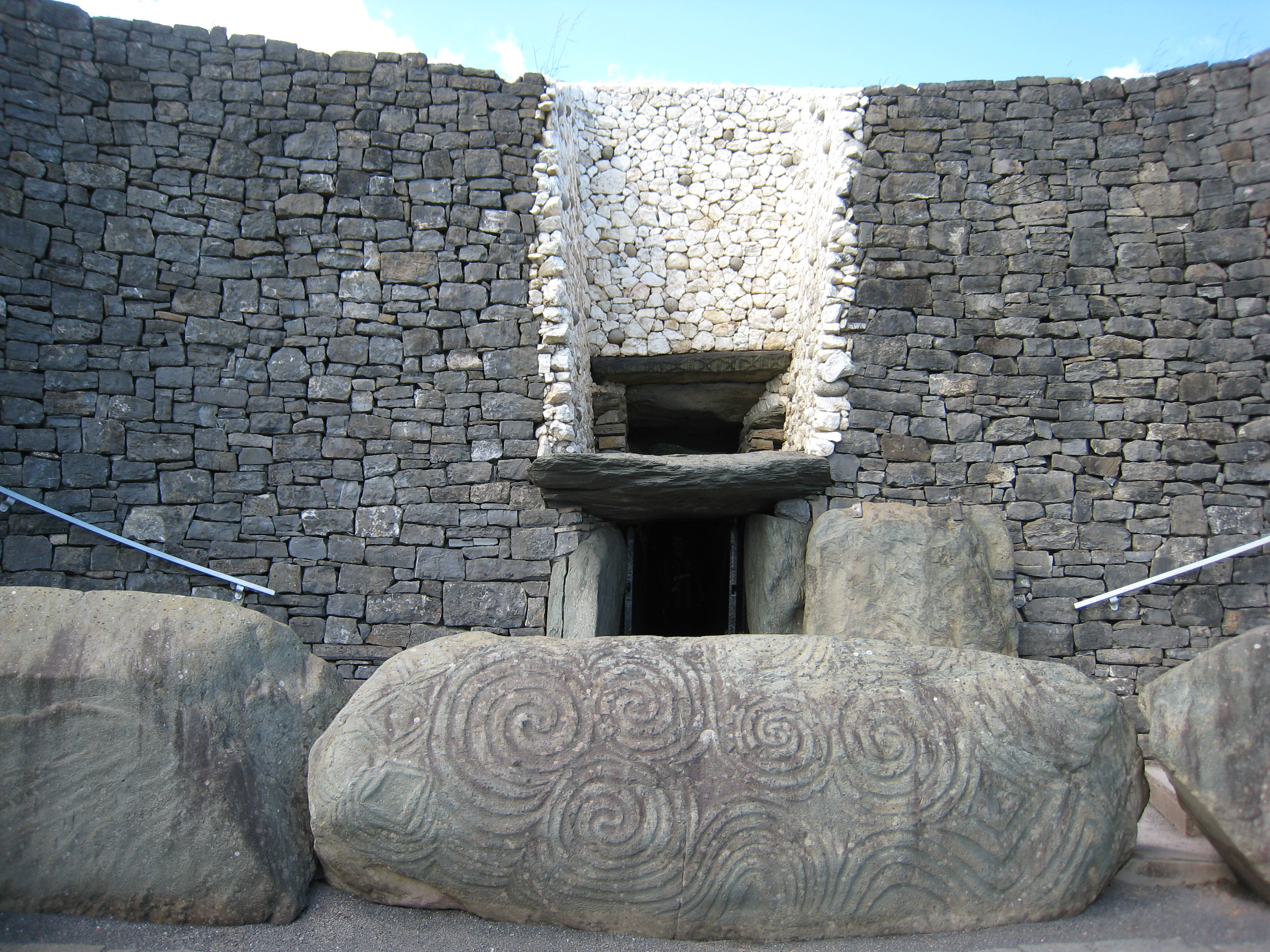
Newgrange entrance (partly reconstructed) and engraved stones, c. 3200 BC

"The Neolithic period is one of remarkable changes in landscapes, societies and technologies, which changed a wild, forested world, to one of orderly agricultural production and settled communities on the brink of socially complex 'civilization'. It was a period that saw the arrival of new ideas and domesticated plants and animals, perhaps new communities, and the transformation of the native peoples of Britain. The Neolithic opened an entirely new episode in human history. It took place in Britain over a relatively short space of time, lasting in total only about 2000 years – in human terms little more than 80–100 generations."

— Archaeologist and prehistorian Caroline Malone on the Neolithic in Britain (2001)

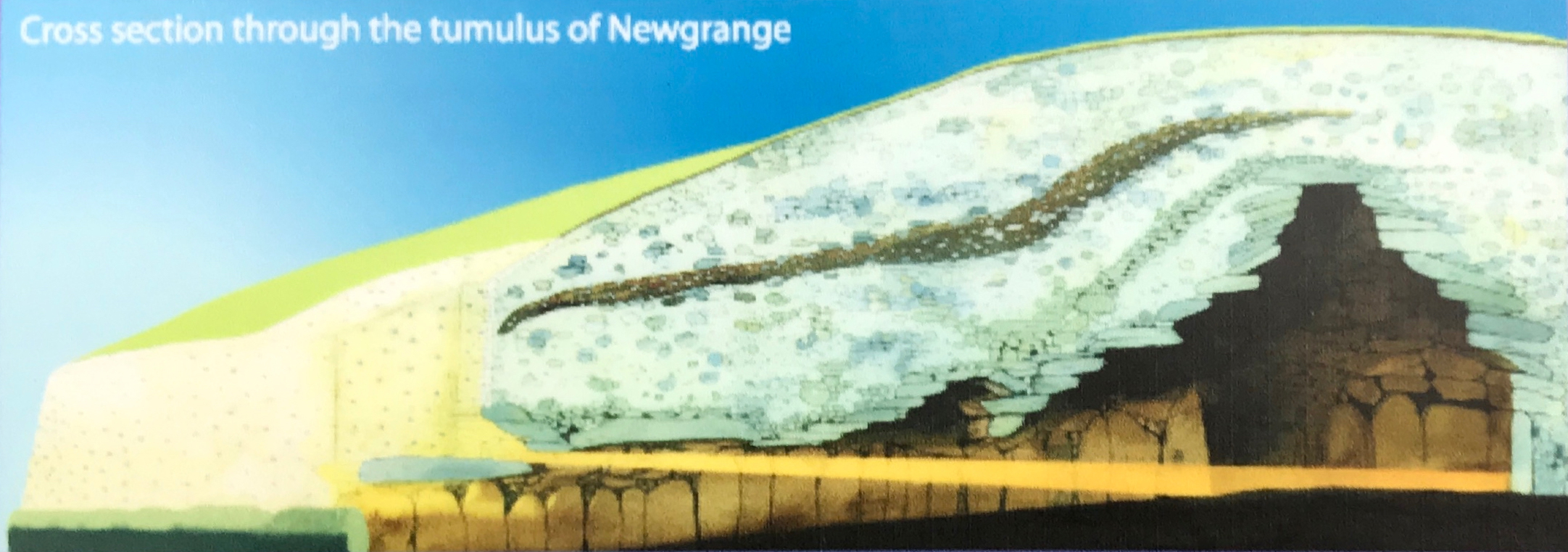
Cross section of the Newgrange tumulus showing sunlight reaching the chamber on the winter solstice

==== Spread of Neolithic ====
Between 10,000 BC to 8,000 BC the Neolithic Revolution in the Near East gradually transformed hunter-gathering societies into settled agricultural societies. Similar developments later occurred independently in Mesoamerica, Southeast Asia, Africa, China and India. It was in the Near East that the "most important developments in early farming" occurred in the Levant and the Fertile Crescent, which stretched through what are now parts of Syria, Lebanon, Israel, Jordan, Turkey, Iran and Iraq, areas that already had rich ecological variation, which was being exploited by hunter-gatherers in the Late Palaeolithic and the Mesolithic periods.

Early signs of these hunter-gatherers beginning to harvest, manipulate and grow various food plants have been identified in the Mesolithic Natufian culture of the Levant, which showed signs that would later lead to the actual domestication and farming of crops. Archaeologists believe that the Levantine peoples subsequently developed agriculture in response to a rise in their population levels that could not be fed by the finite food resources that hunting and gathering could provide. The idea of agriculture subsequently spread from the Levant into Europe and was adopted by hunter-gathering societies in what is now Turkey, Greece, the Balkans and across the Mediterranean and eventually reached north-western Europe and the British Isles.

==== The Neolithic in the British Isles ====
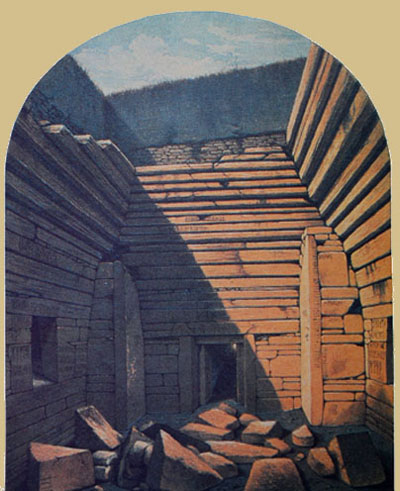
Maes Howe, Orkney, Scotland, c. 2800 BC. Drawing made in 1861 shortly after the excavation through the roof of Maeshowe by the antiquarian James Farrer

Until recently, archaeologists debated whether the Neolithic Revolution was brought to the British Isles through adoption by natives or by migrating groups of Continental Europeans who settled there.

A 2019 study found that the Neolithic farmers of the British Isles had entered the region through a mass migration c. 4100 BC. They were closely related to Neolithic peoples of Iberia, which implies that they were descended from agriculturalists who had moved westwards from the Balkans along the Mediterranean coast. The arrival of farming populations led to the almost-complete replacement of the native Mesolithic hunter-gatherers of the British Isles, who did not experience a genetic resurgence in the succeeding centuries.

The 2003 discovery of the Ness of Brodgar site has presented an example of a highly-sophisticated and possibly-religious complex in the British Isles dating from around 3500 BC, before the first pyramids and contemporary with the city of Uruk. The site is still in early stages of excavation but is expected to yield major contributions to knowledge of the period.

=== Late Neolithic: 3000–2500 BC ===
- Meldon Bridge Period

=== End of the Neolithic ===
"After over a thousand years of early farming, a way of life based on ancestral tombs, forest clearance and settlement expansion came to an end. This was a time of important social changes."

— Archaeologist and prehistorian Mike Parker Pearson on the Late Neolithic in Britain (2005)

From the Beaker culture period onwards, all British individuals had high proportions of Steppe ancestry and were genetically more similar to Beaker-associated people from the Lower Rhine area. Beakers arrived in Britain around 2500 BC, with migrations of Yamnaya-related people, resulting in a nearly-total turnover of the British population. The study argues that more than 90% of Britain's Neolithic gene pool was replaced with the coming of the Beaker people.

== Characteristics ==
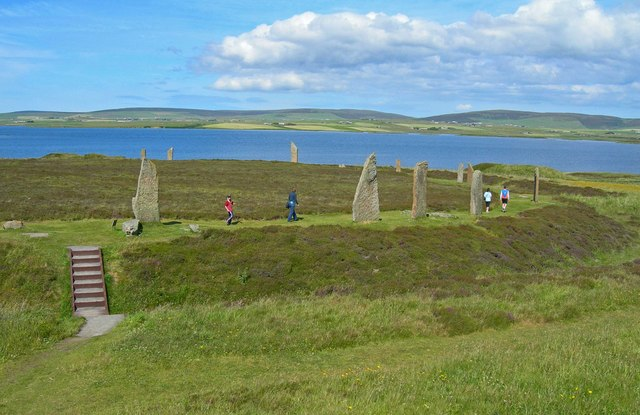
The Ring of Brodgar stone circle, Orkney, Scotland, c. 2500 BC

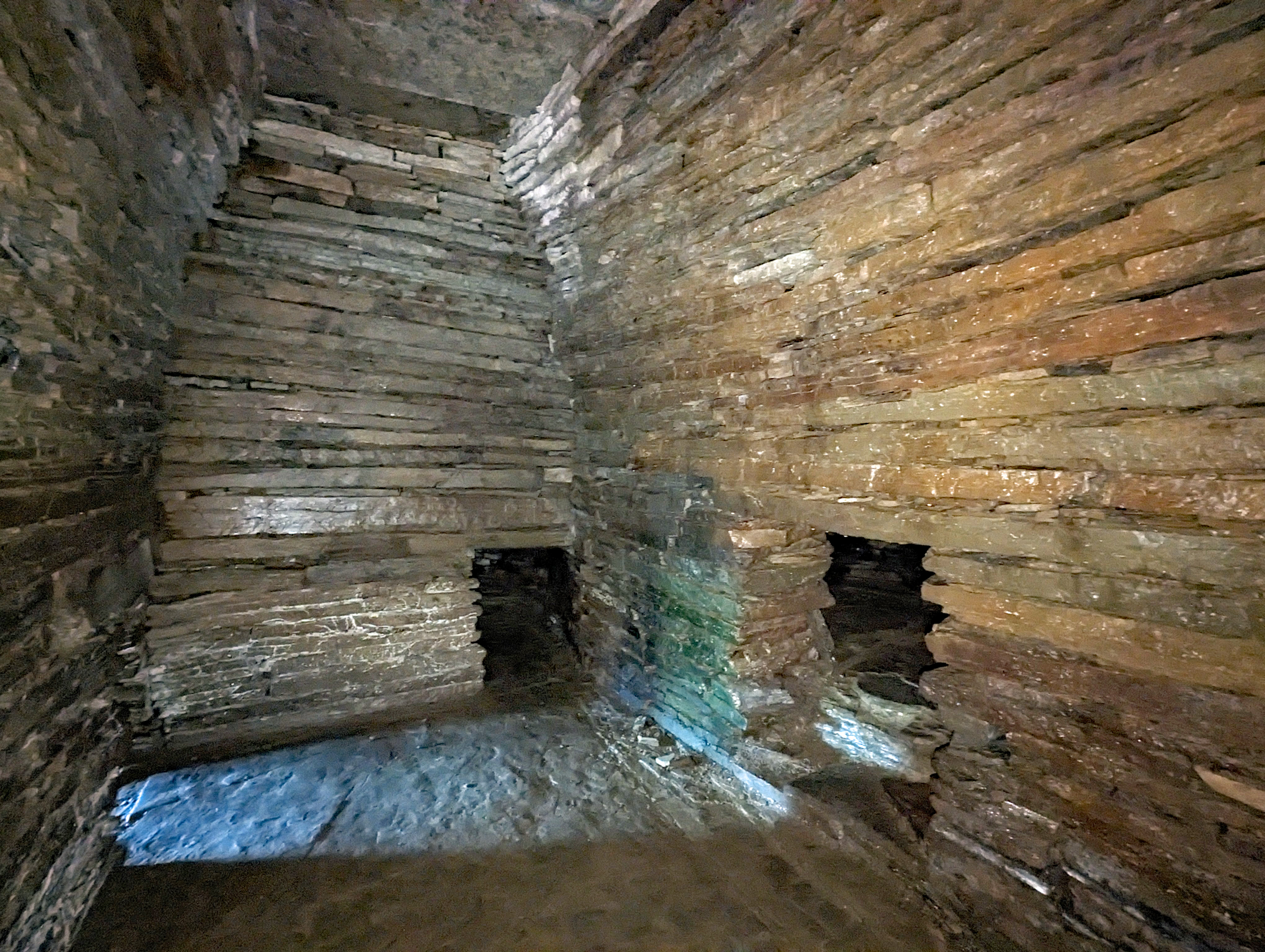
Cuween Hill Chambered Cairn, Orkney, c. 3000 BC

=== Agriculture ===
The Neolithic is largely categorised by the introduction of farming to Britain from Continental Europe from where it had originally come from the Middle East. Until then, during the Palaeolithic and Mesolithic periods, the island's inhabitants had been hunter-gatherers, and the transition from a hunter-gatherer society to an agricultural one did not occur all at once. There is also some evidence of different agricultural and hunter-gatherer groups within the British Isles meeting and trading with one another in the early part of the Neolithic, with some hunter-gatherer sites showing evidence of more complex, Neolithic technologies. Archaeologists disagree about whether the transition from hunter-gatherer to agricultural society was gradual, over a period of centuries, or rapid, accomplished within a century or two. The process of the introduction of agriculture is still not fully understood, and as the archaeologist Mike Parker Pearson noted:

There is no doubt that domesticated animals and plants had to be carried by boat from the continent of Europe to the British Isles. There are a number of options. Groups of pioneers could have set off from the continent in one-off small-scale invasions. Or people might have arrived after a long-term and eclectic mixture of contacts down the continental coast from Denmark to France. Or gatherer-hunters might have traveled by boat to the continent and brought back the animals and plants as the result of slowly developing exchange contacts. There is no answer to this puzzle, which is all the more intriguing since the earliest evidence for farming in the British Isles comes from Ireland and probably the Isle of Man, and not from southern Britain.

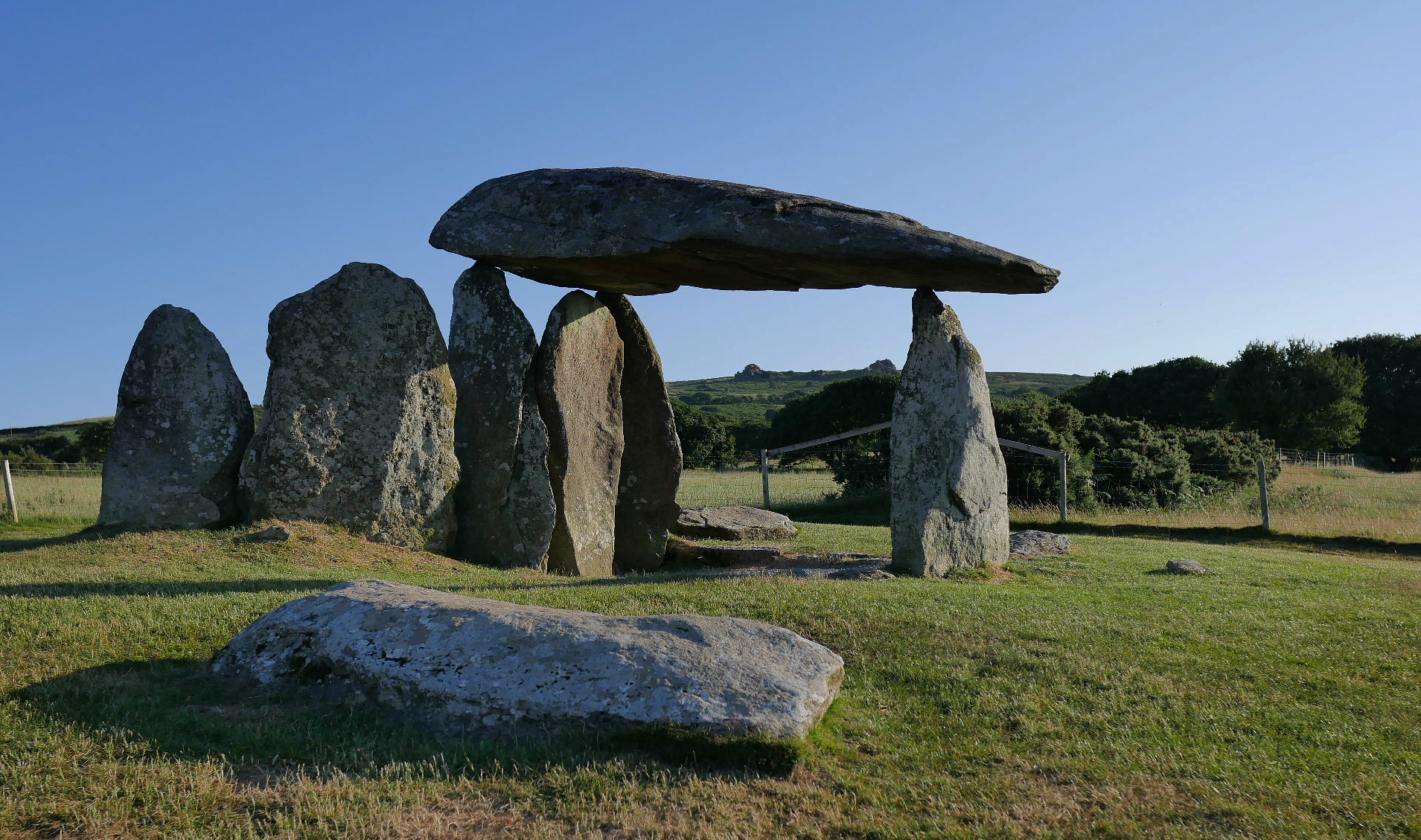
Pentre Ifan, Wales, c. 3500 BC

The reason for switching from a hunter-gatherer to an agricultural lifestyle has been widely debated by archaeologists and anthropologists. Ethnographic studies of farming societies who use basic stone tools and crops have shown that it is a much more labour-intensive way of life than that of hunter-gatherers. It would have involved deforesting an area, digging and tilling the soil, storing seeds, and then guarding the growing crops from other animal species before eventually harvesting them. In the cases of grains, the crop produced then has to be processed to make it edible, including grinding, milling and cooking. All of that involves far more preparation and work than either hunting or gathering.

=== Deforestation ===
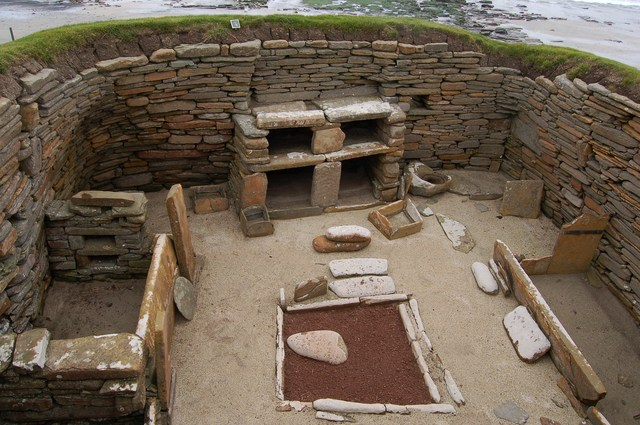
The inside of the Neolithic houses constructed at Skara Brae in Orkney, northern Scotland, 3180–2500 BC

The Neolithic agriculturalists deforested areas of woodland in the British Isles to use the cleared land for farming. Notable examples of forest clearance occurred around 5000 BCE in Broome Heath in East Anglia, on the North Yorkshire Moors and also on Dartmoor. Such clearances were performed not only with the use of stone axes but also through ring barking and burning, with the last two likely having been more effective. Nonetheless, in many areas, the forests had regrown within a few centuries, including at Ballysculion, Ballynagilly, Beaghmore and the Somerset Levels.

Between 4300 and 3250 BCE, there was a widespread decline in the number of elm trees across Britain, with millions of them disappearing from the archaeological record, and archaeologists have in some cases attributed that to the arrival of Neolithic farmers. For instance, it has been suggested that farmers collected all the elm leaves to use as animal fodder during the winter and that the trees died after being debarked by domesticated cattle. Nonetheless, as Pearson highlighted, the decline in elm might be due to the elm bark beetle, a parasitic insect that carries with it Dutch elm disease, and evidence for which has been found at West Heath Spa in Hampshire. It is possible that the spread of those beetles was coincidental although the hypothesis has also been suggested that farmers intentionally spread the beetles so that they destroyed the elm forests to provide more deforested land for farming.

Meanwhile, from around 3500 to 3300 BCE, many of those deforested areas began to see reforestation and mass tree regrowth, indicating that human activity had retreated from those areas.

=== Settlement ===
Around the period between 3500 and 3300 BC, agricultural communities had begun centring themselves upon the most productive areas, where the soils were more fertile, namely around the Boyne, Orkney, eastern Scotland, Anglesey, the upper Thames, Wessex, Essex, Yorkshire and the river valleys of The Wash. Those areas saw an intensification of agricultural production and larger settlements.

The Neolithic houses of the British Isles were typically rectangular and made out of wood and so none had survived to this day. Nonetheless, foundations of such buildings have been found in the archaeological record although they are rare and have usually been uncovered only when they were in the vicinity of the more substantial Neolithic stone monuments.

=== Monumental architecture ===
==== Chambered tombs ====
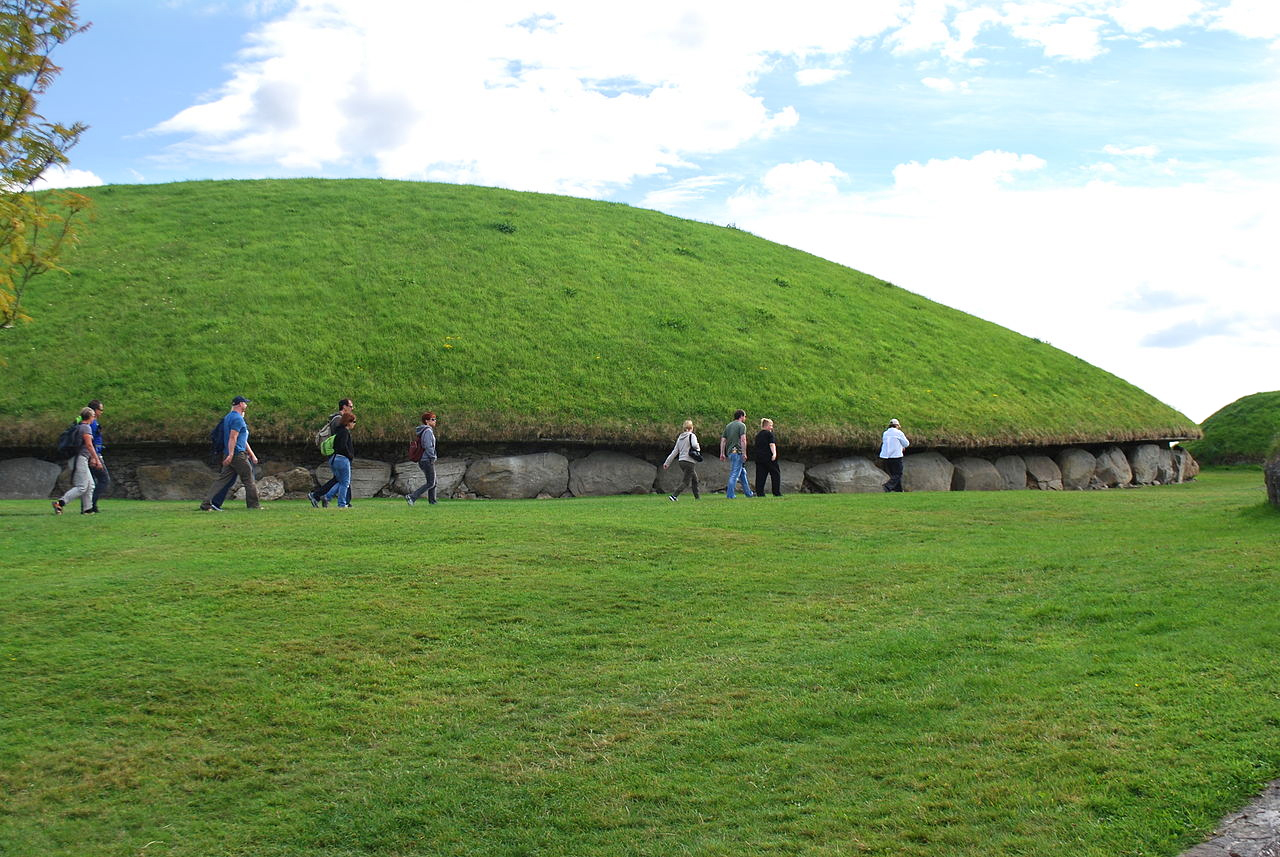
Knowth, County Meath, Ireland, c. 3200 BC

The Early and the Middle Neolithic also saw the construction of large megalithic tombs across the British Isles. Because they housed the bodies of the dead, those tombs have typically been considered by archaeologists to be a possible indication of ancestor veneration by those who constructed them. Such Neolithic tombs are common across much of Western Europe, from Iberia to Scandinavia, and they were therefore likely brought to the British Isles along with or roughly concurrent to the introduction of farming. A widely-held theory amongst archaeologists is that those megalithic tombs were intentionally made to resemble the long timber houses, which had been constructed by Neolithic farming peoples in the Danube basin from circa 4800 BC.

As the historian Ronald Hutton related, "There is no doubt that these great tombs, far more impressive than would be required of mere repositories for bones, were the centres of ritual activity in the early Neolithic: they were shrines as well as mausoleums. For some reason, the success of farming and the veneration of ancestral and more recent bones had become bound up together in the minds of the people".

Although there are disputed radiocarbon dates indicating that the chambered tomb at Carrowmore in Ireland dates to circa 5000 BCE, the majority of such monuments in the British Isles appear to have been built between 4000 and 3200 BC, a time period that the archaeologist Mike Parker Pearson notes means that tomb building was "a relatively short-lived fashion in archaeological terms".

==== Stone circles ====
The Late Neolithic also saw the construction of megalithic stone circles.

== Society and culture ==
=== Stone technology ===
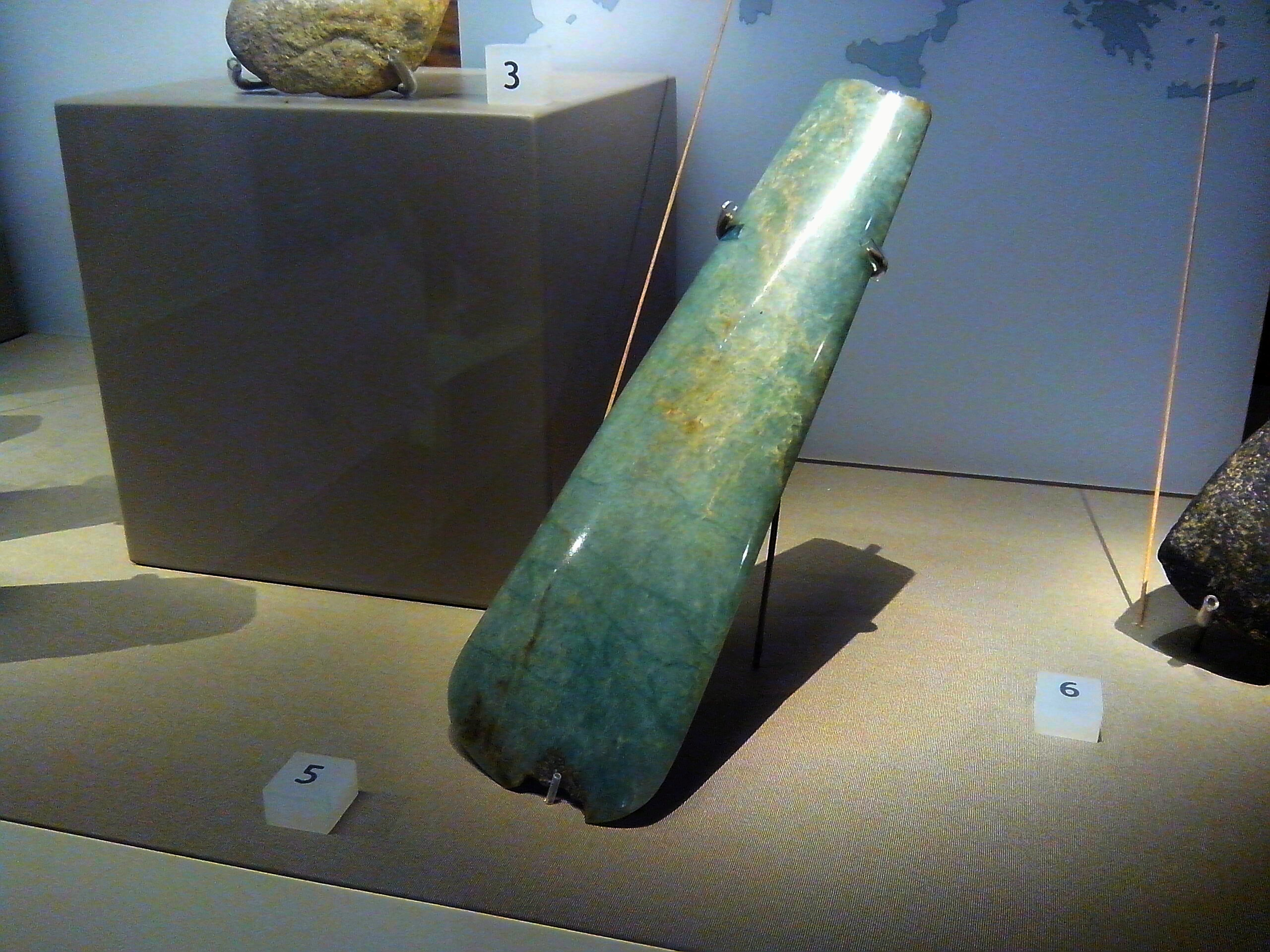
Jade axe from Breamore, Hampshire, c. 3900 BC. Petrological analysis has shown that the axehead is Alpine jadeite originally from the Italian Alps.

The stone or "lithic" technology of the British Neolithic differed from that of Mesolithic and Palaeolithic Britain. Whereas Mesolithic hunter-gatherer tools were microliths (small, sharp shards of flint), Neolithic agriculturalists used larger lithic tools. Typically, they included axes, made out of either flint or hard igneous rock hafted on to wooden handles. While some of them were evidently used for chopping wood and other practical purposes, there are some axe heads from the period that appear never to have been used, some being too fragile to have been used in any case. The latter axes most likely had a decorative or ceremonial function.

=== Settlement ===
Neolithic Britons were capable of building a variety of different wooden constructions. For instance, in the marshland of the Somerset Levels in south-western Britain, a wooden trackway was built in the winter of 3807 BC and connected the Polden Hills with Westhay Mears, a length which ran for over a kilometre. Neolithic Britons lived in patrilineal communities.

=== Diet ===
Being agriculturalists, the Neolithic peoples of the British Isles grew cereal grains such as wheat and barley, which therefore played a part in their diet. Nonetheless, they were supplemented at times with wild undomesticated plant foods such as hazelnuts.

There is also evidence that grapes had been consumed in Neolithic Wessex, based upon charred pips found at the site of Hambledon Hill. They may have been imported from Continental Europe, or they might have been grown on British soil, as the climate was warmer than that of the early 21st century.

=== Religion ===
As the archaeologist John C. Barrett noted, "There never was a single body of beliefs which characterise 'neolithic religion'... The variety of practices attested by [the various Neolithic] monuments cannot be explained as the expression of a single, underlying cultural idea".

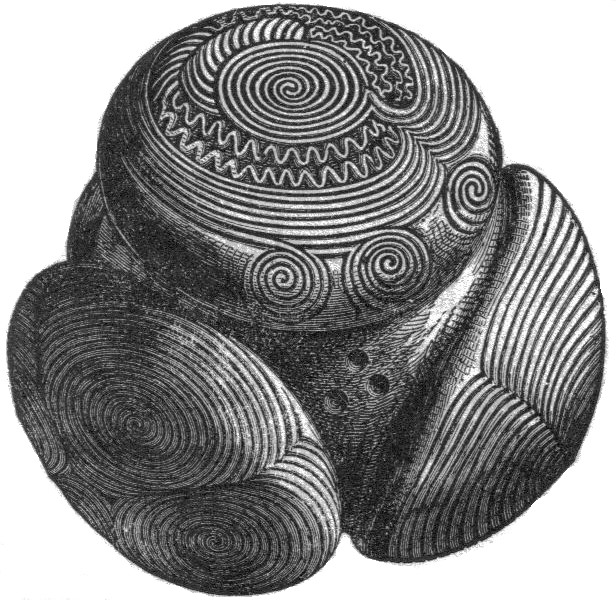
Carved stone ball from Towie, Scotland, c. 3200 BC

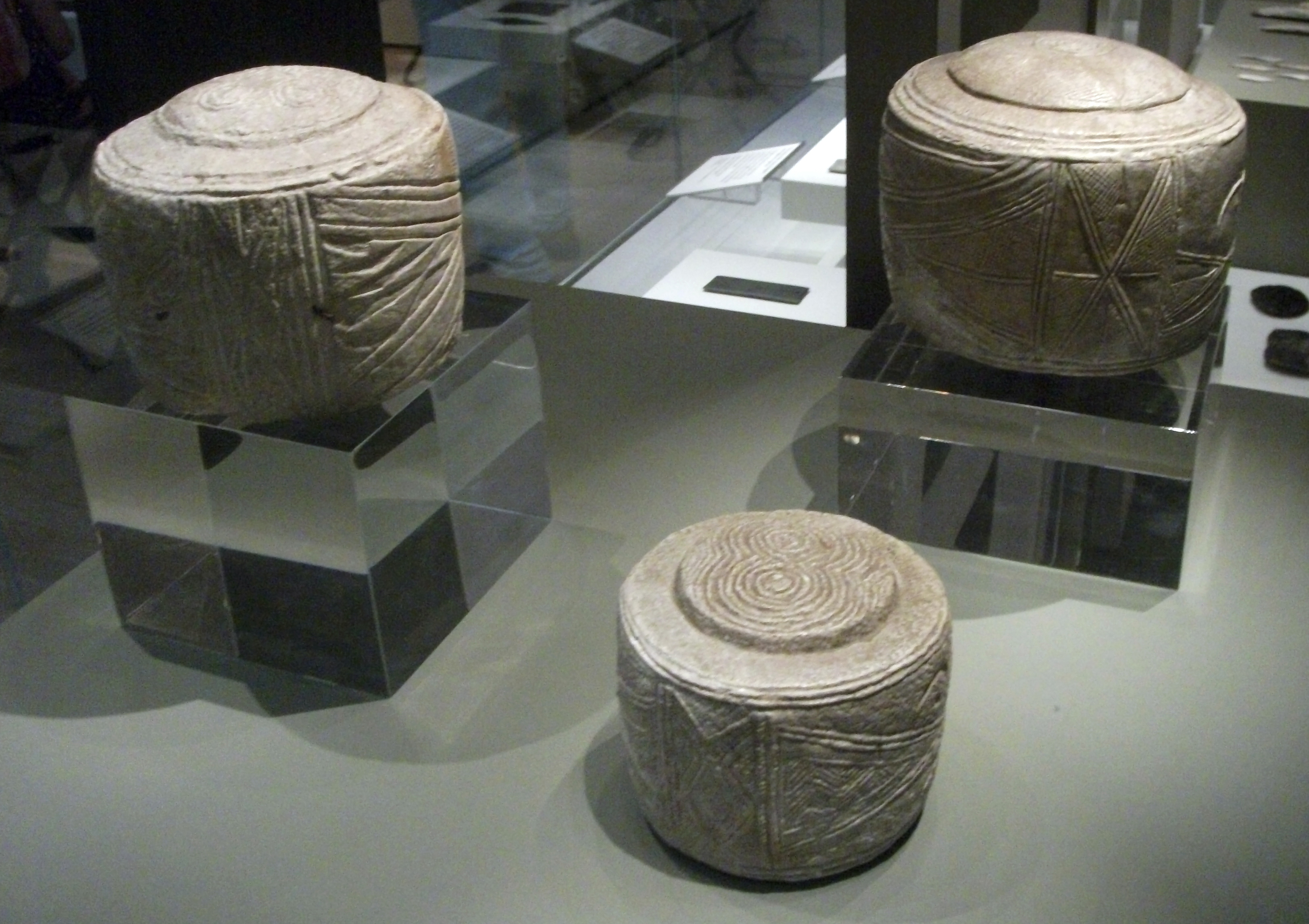
Folkton Drums, England, c. 2600 BC

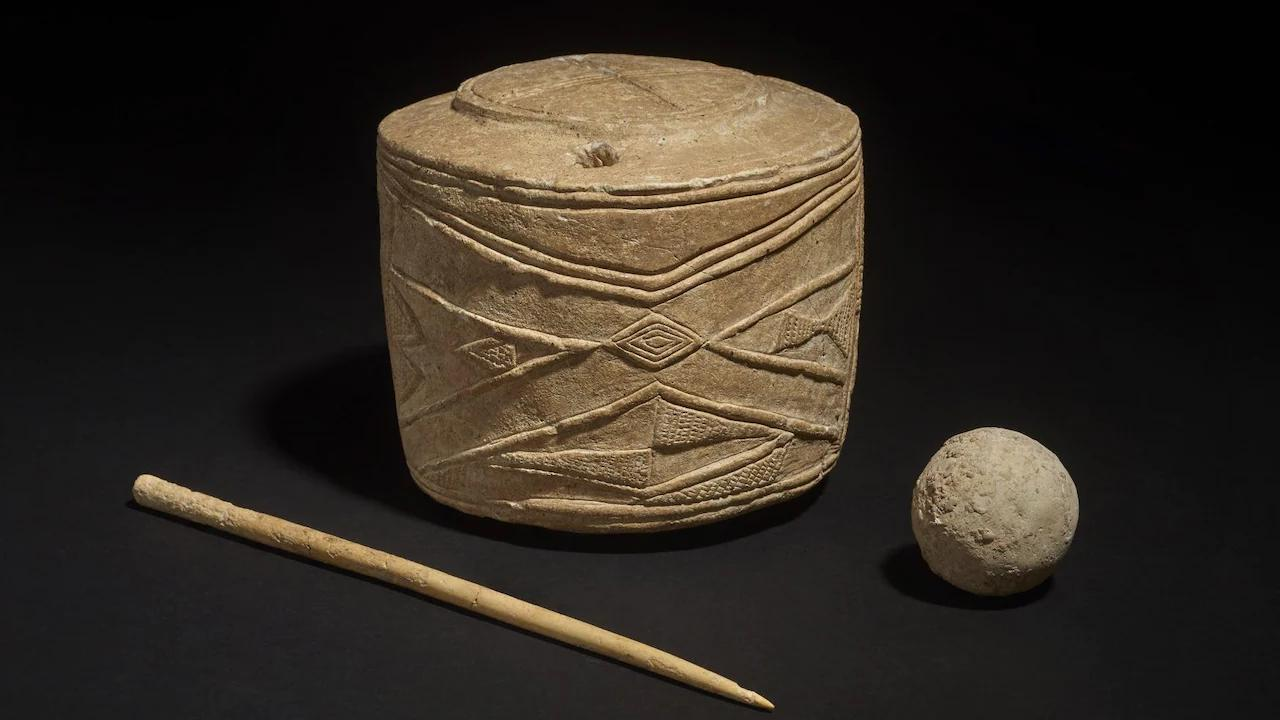
Burton Agnes drum, England, c. 3000 BC

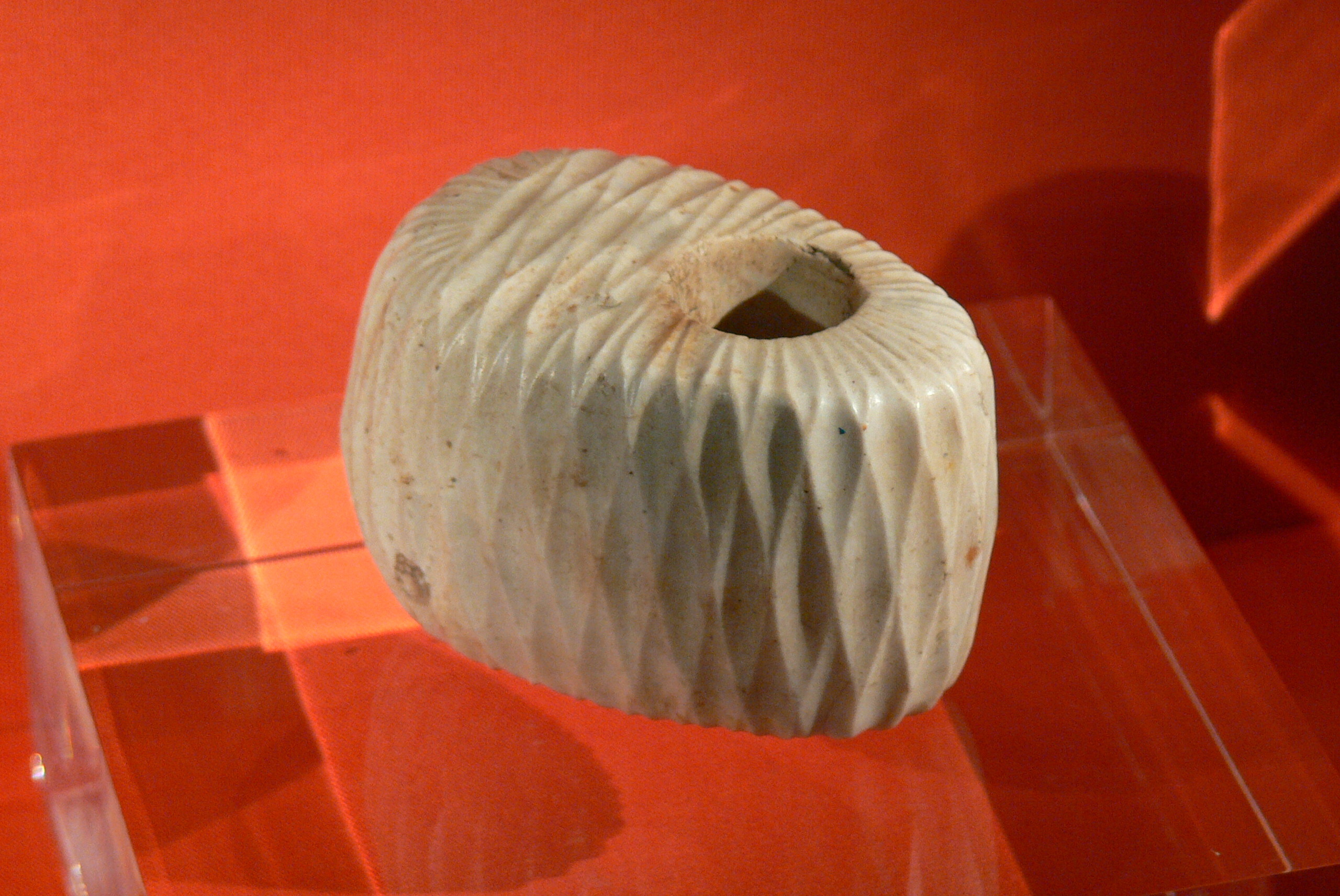
Macehead, Wales, 3000–2500 BC

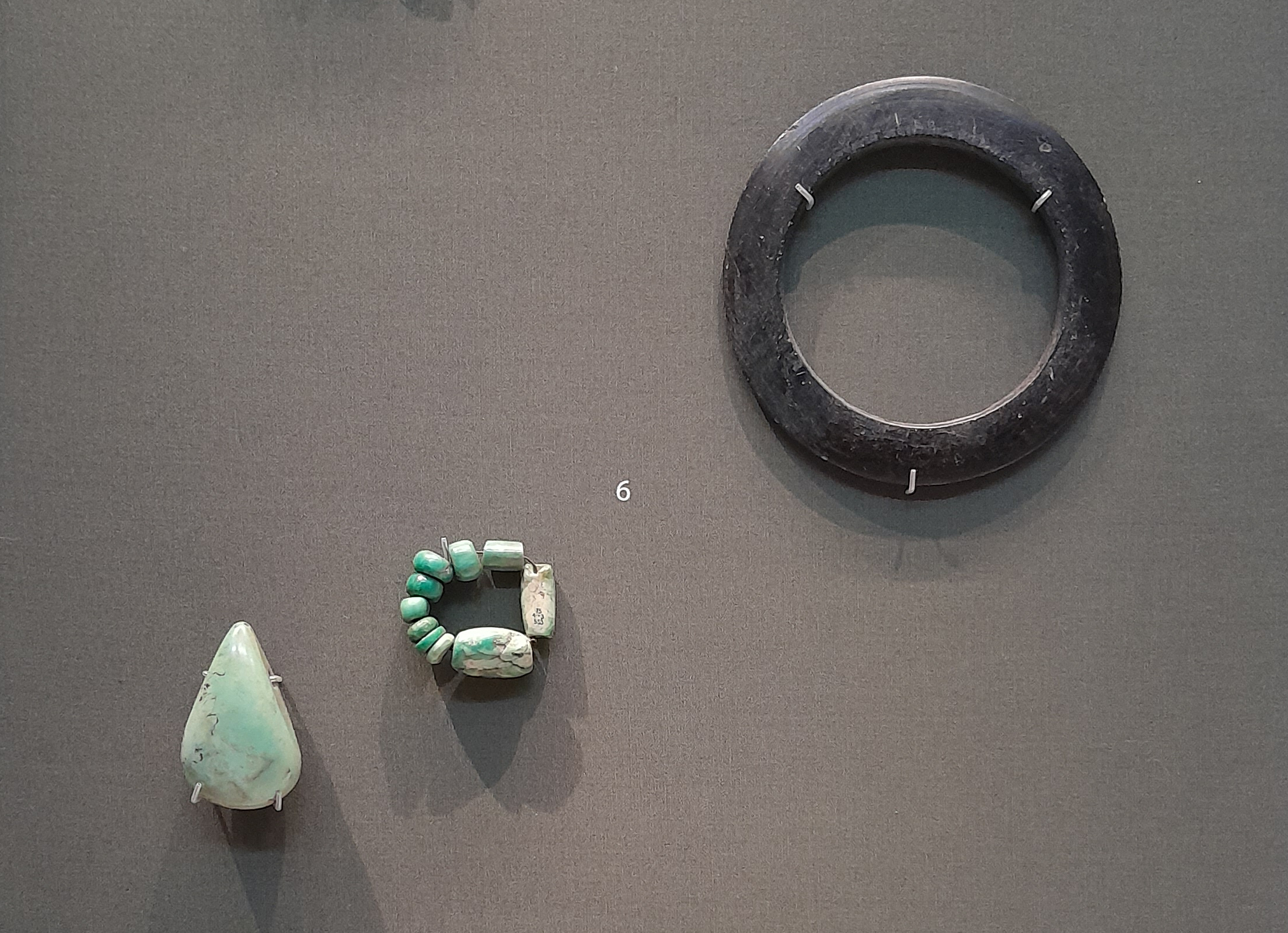
Stone armring and callaïs jewellery

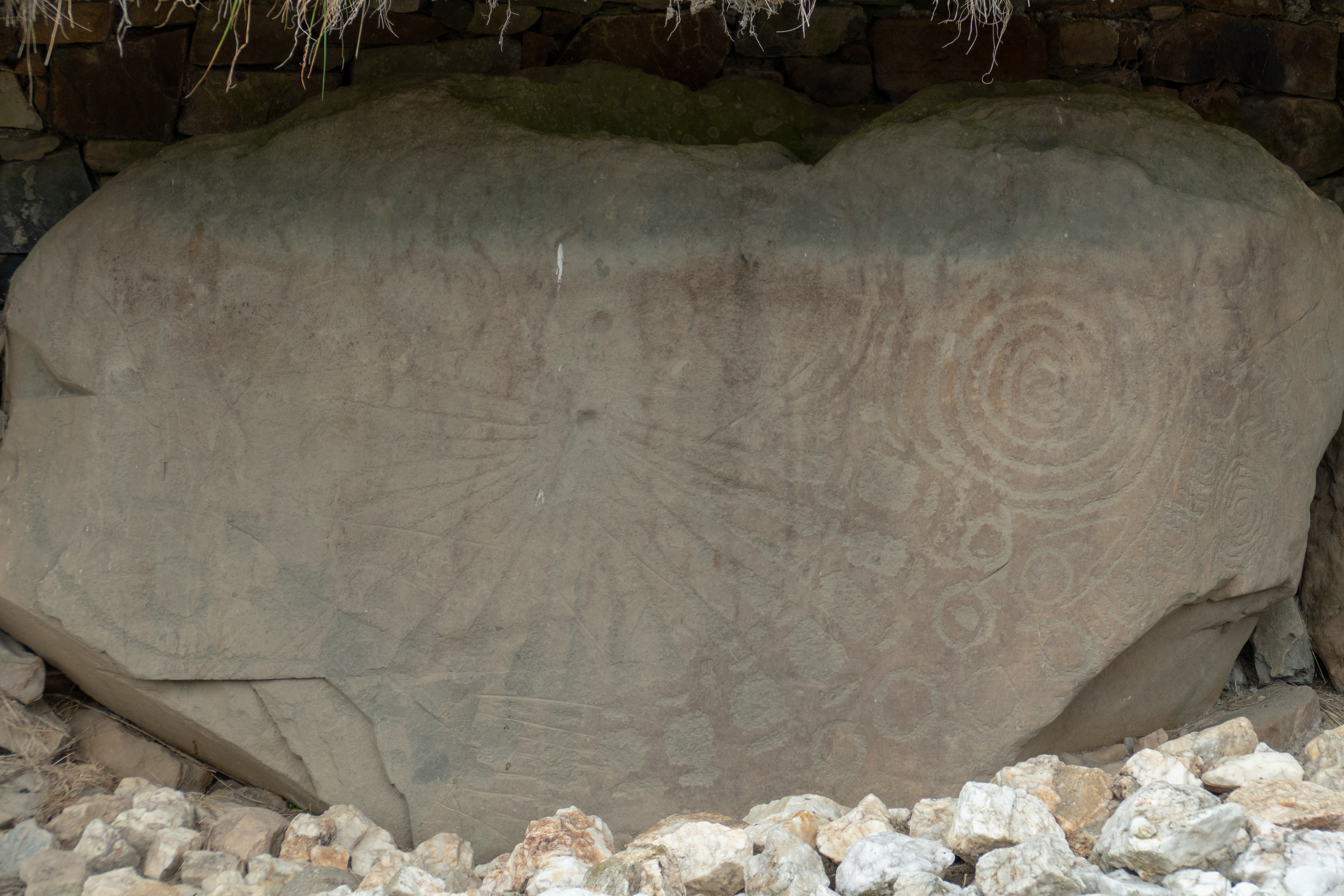
Engraved 'calendar stone' at Knowth

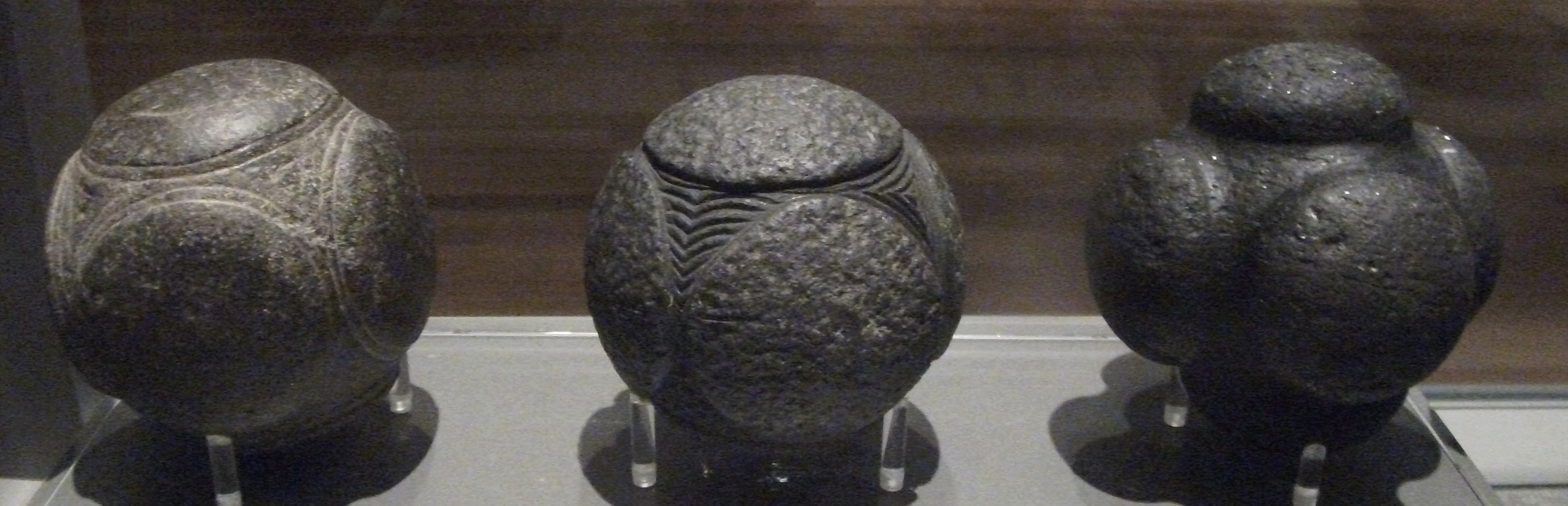
Carved stone balls, Scotland

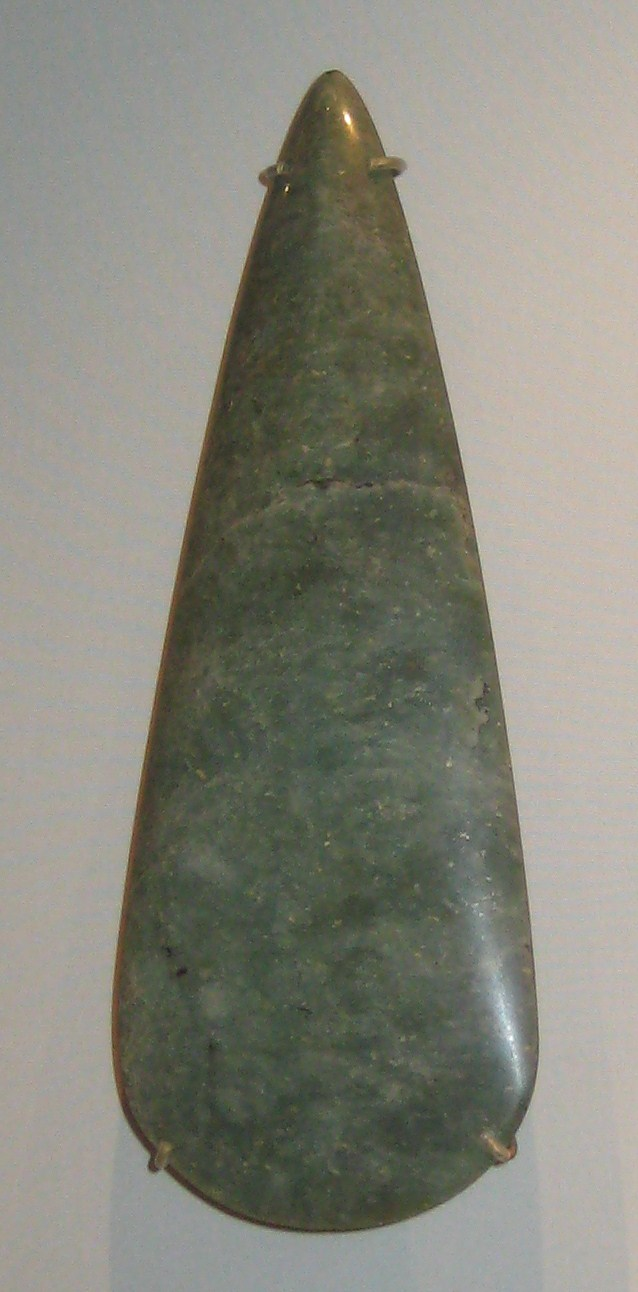
Jade axe, England, c. 3000 BC

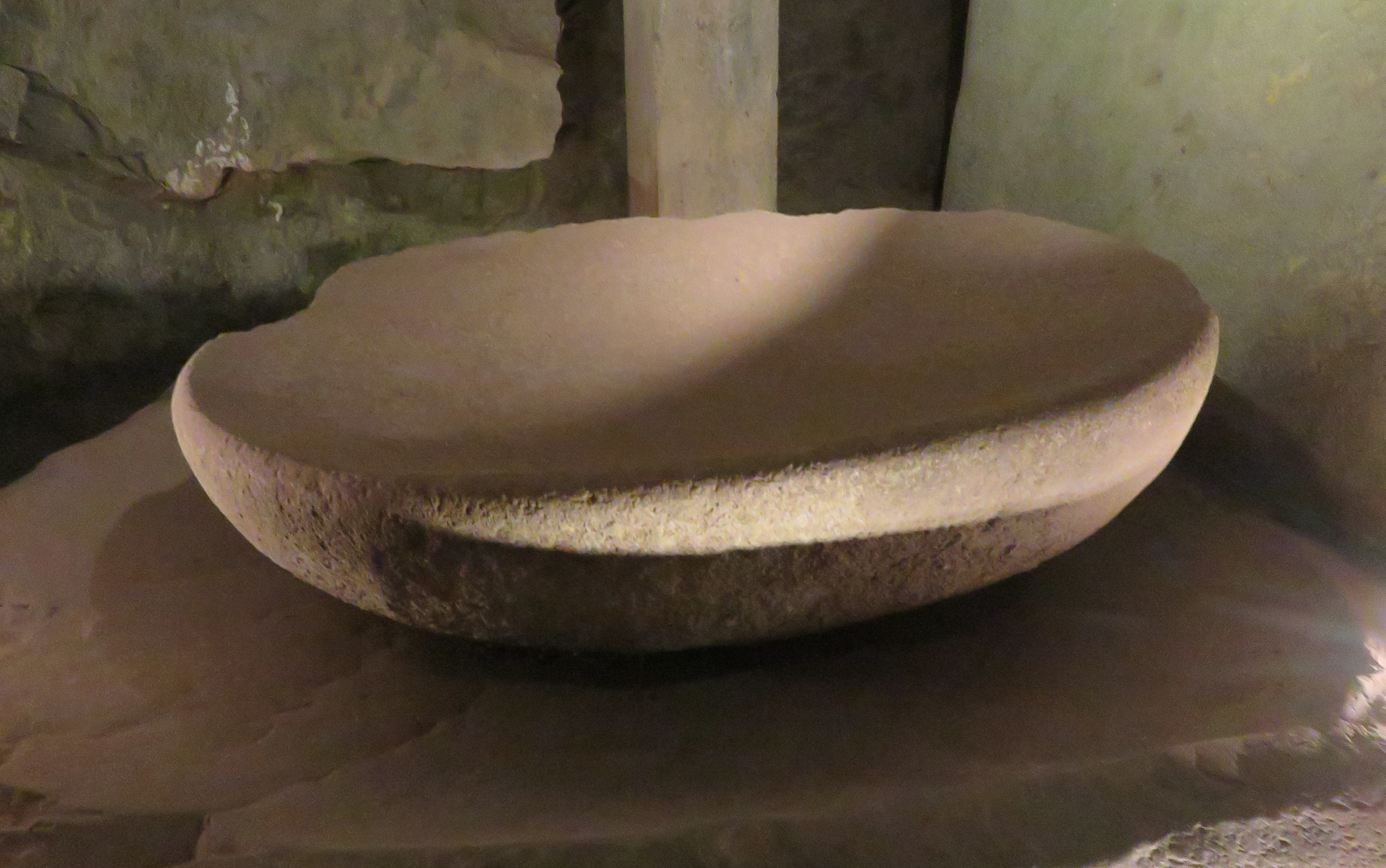
Chiselled granite basin, Newgrange

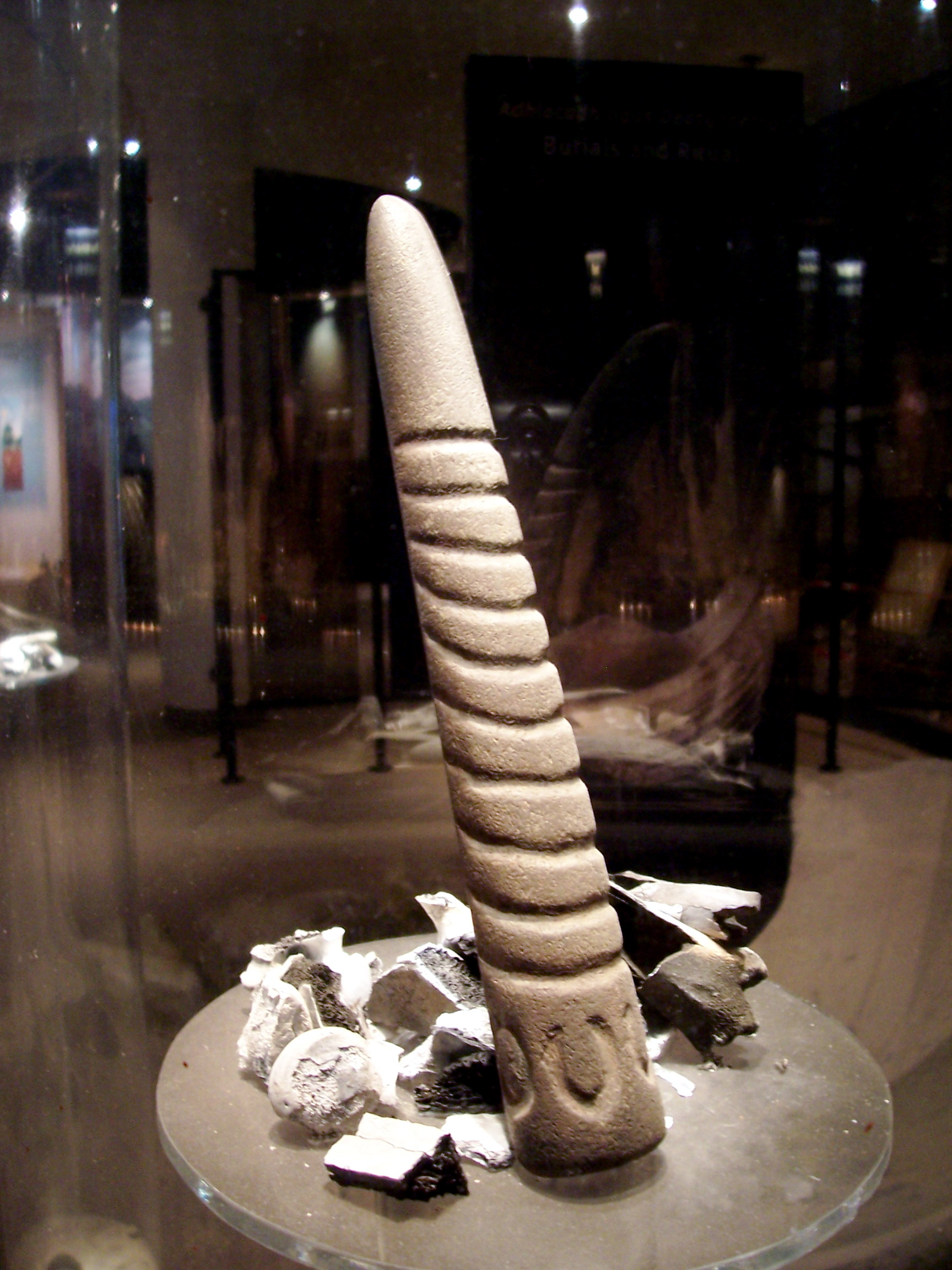
Carved stone from Newgrange

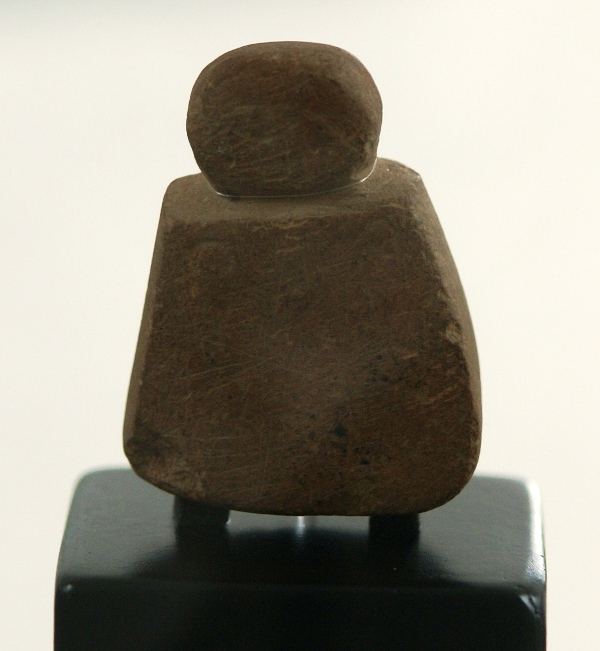
The 'Westray Wife' from Orkney

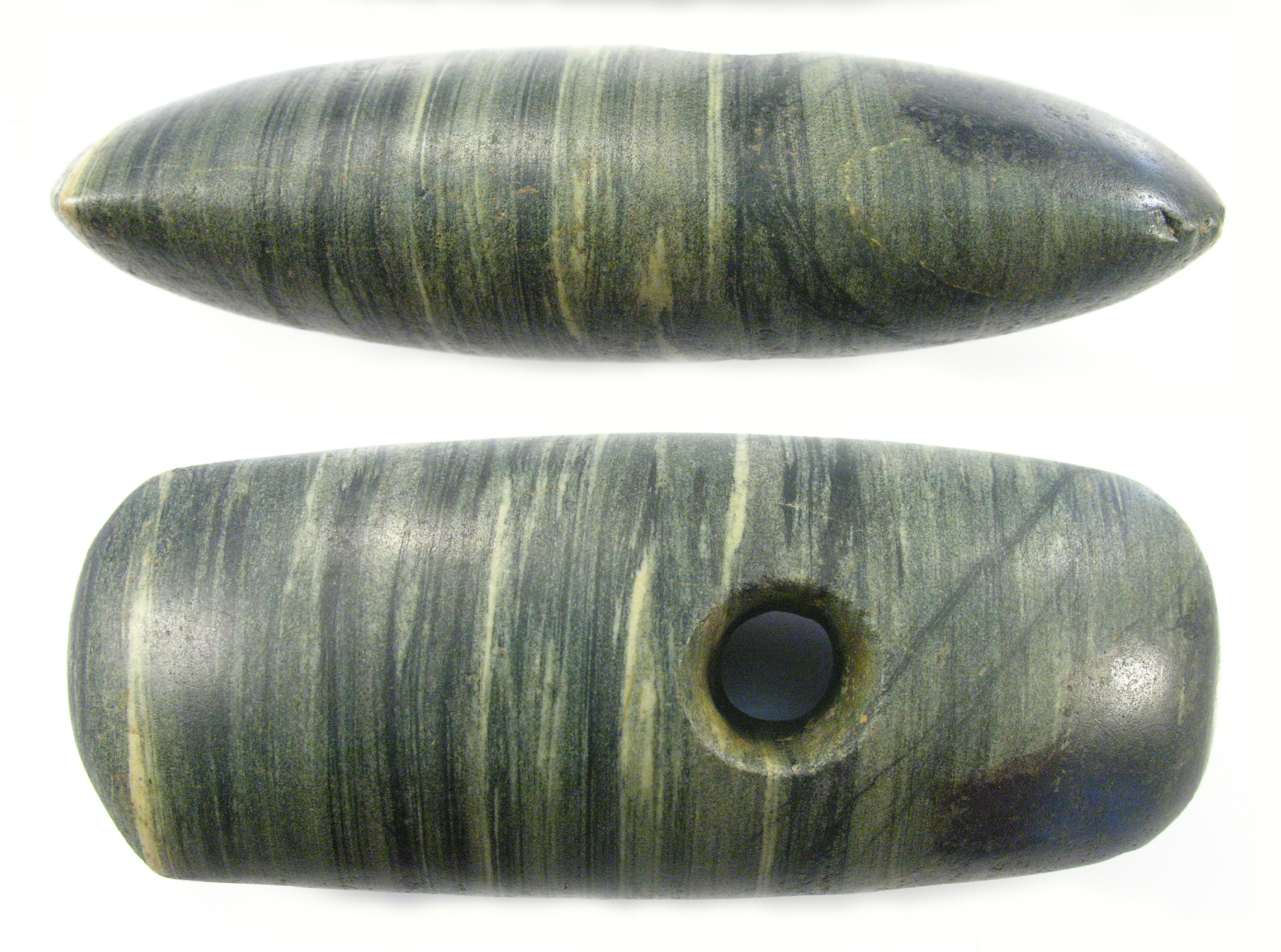
Polished stone macehead, England, c. 2900 BC

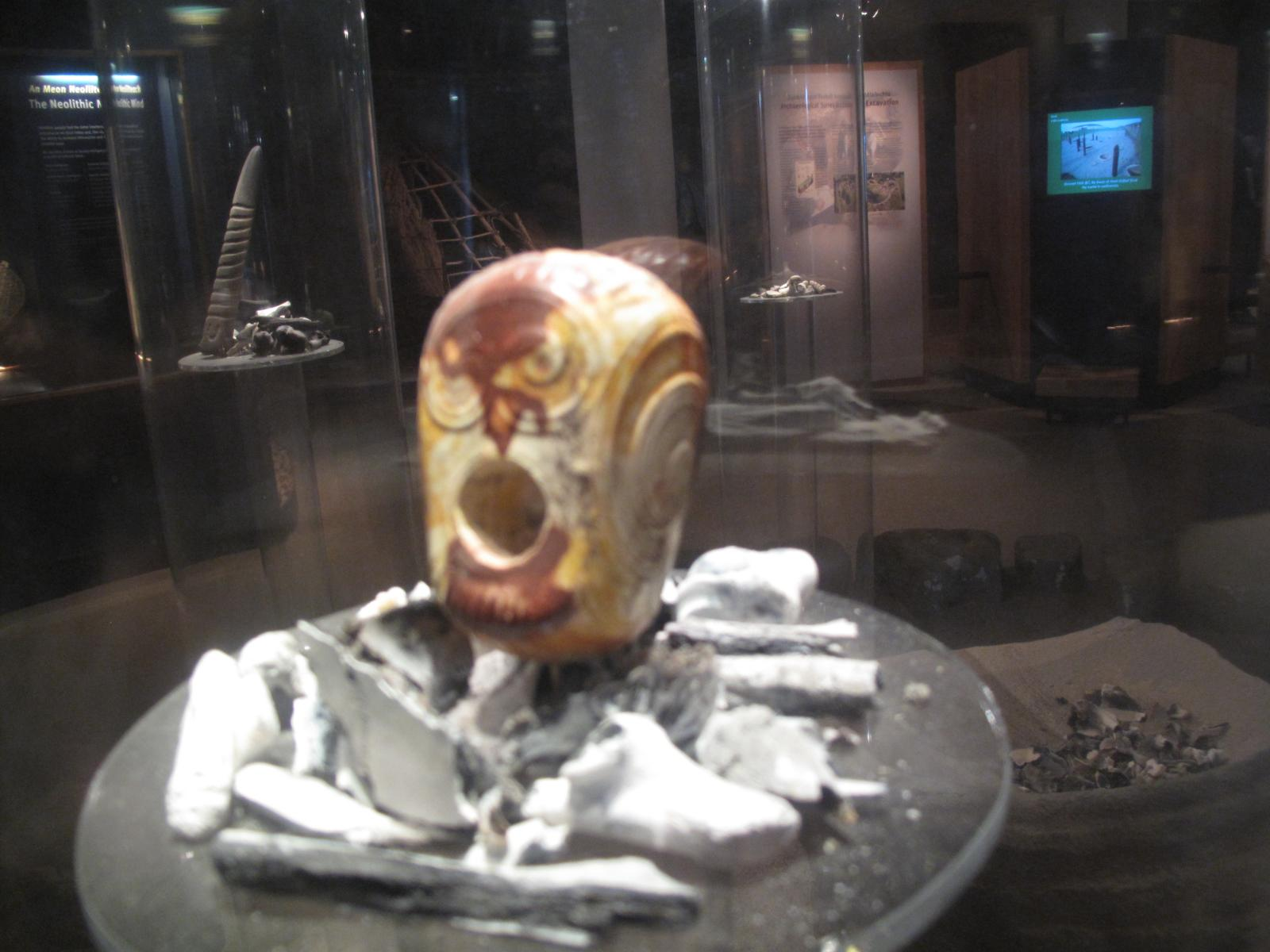
Macehead from Knowth

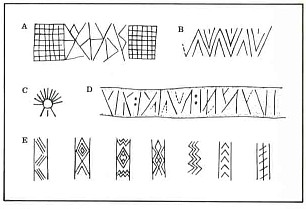
Inscribed symbols from Skara Brae

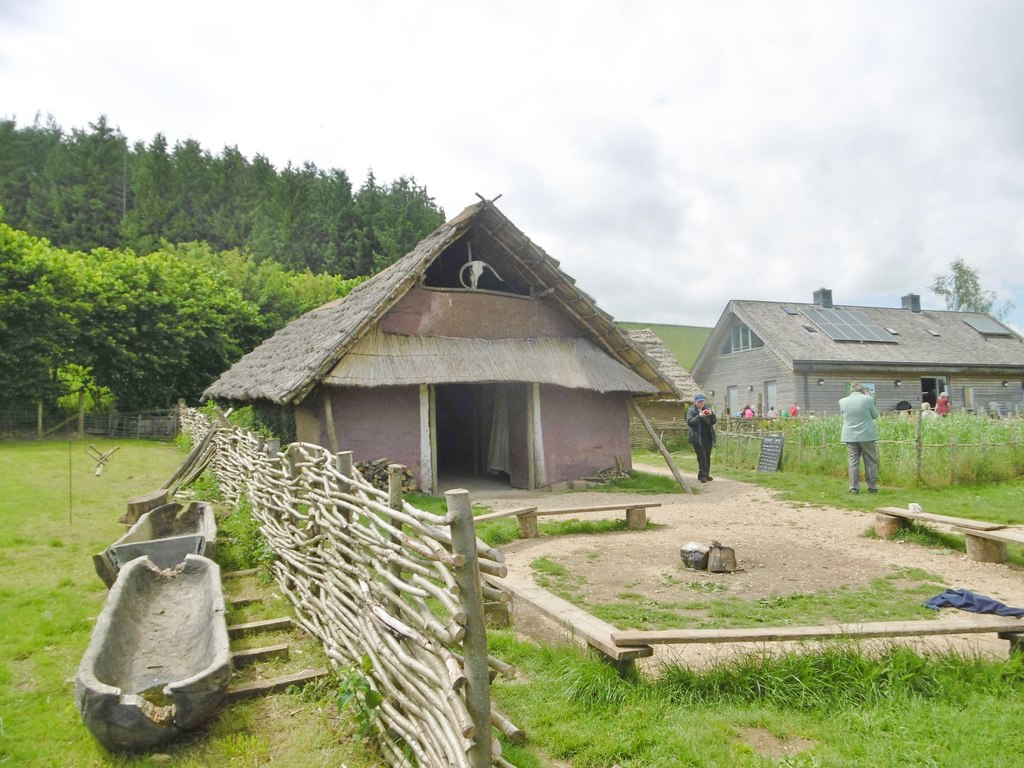
Neolithic house reconstruction at Butser Farm

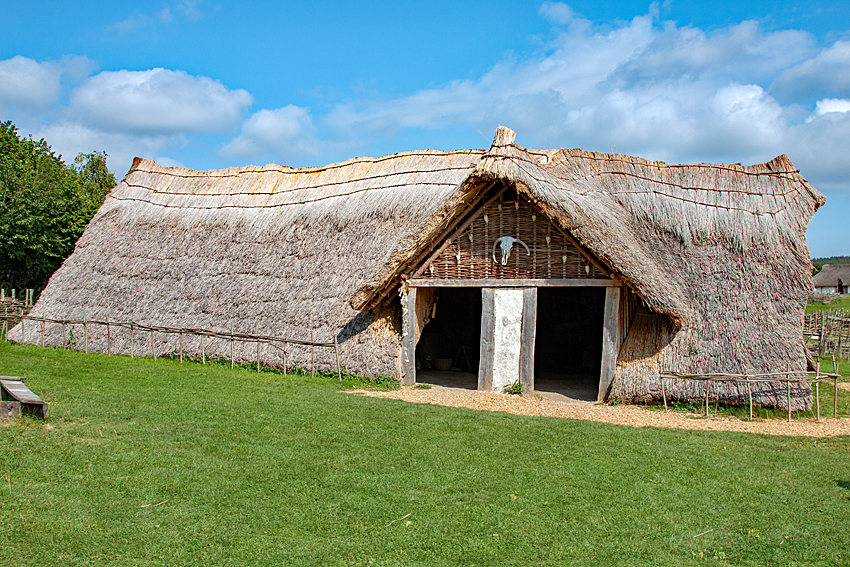
Neolithic house, 3800 BC, reconstruction at Butser Farm

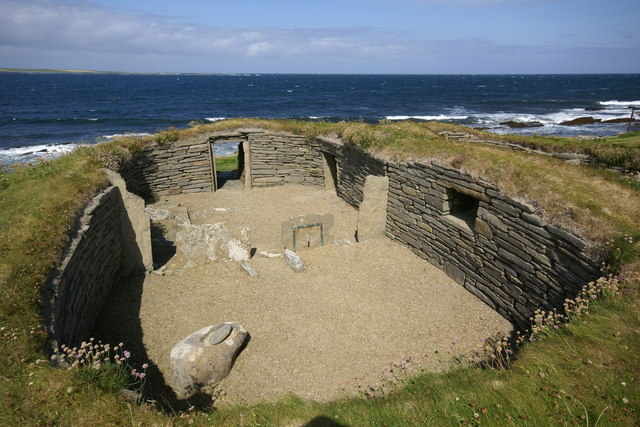
Knap of Howar, Orkney, Scotland, 3700–2800 BC

== Antiquarian and archaeological investigations ==
=== 17th and 18th centuries ===
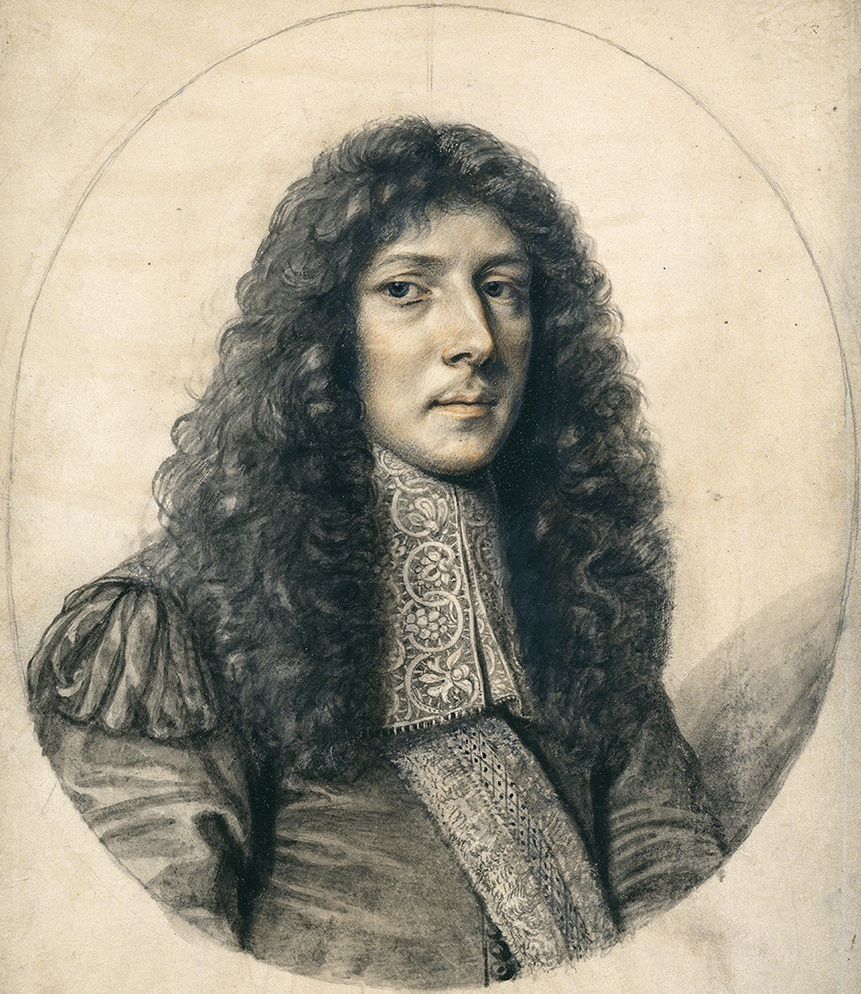
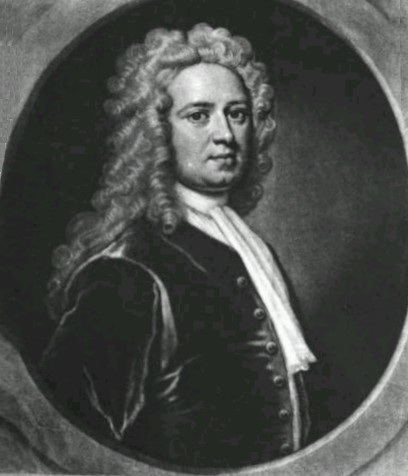
The antiquarians John Aubrey and William Stukeley were responsible for initiating modern study of Neolithic monuments like Stonehenge and Avebury.

It was in the 17th century AD that scholarly investigation into the surviving Neolithic monuments first began in the British Isles, but at the time, these antiquarian scholars had relatively little understanding of prehistory and were Biblical literalists, who believed that the Earth itself was only around 5000 years old.

The first to do so was the antiquary and writer John Aubrey (1626–1697), who had been born into a wealthy gentry family before he went on to study at Trinity College, Oxford, until his education was disrupted by the outbreak of the English Civil War between Royalist and Parliamentarian forces. He recorded his accounts of the megalithic monuments in a book, the Monumenta Britannica, but it remained unpublished.

Nonetheless, Aubrey's work was picked up by another antiquarian in the following century, William Stukeley (1687–1765), who had studied at Corpus Christi College, Cambridge before he became a professional doctor.

=== 19th century ===
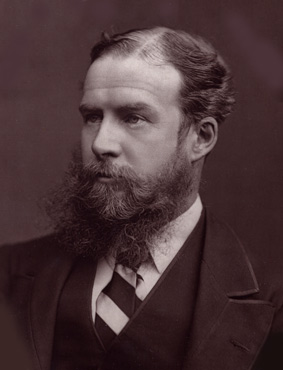
The archaeologist Sir John Lubbock was the first to coin the term "Neolithic", in 1865.

The term "Neolithic" was first coined by the archaeologist John Lubbock, 1st Baron Avebury, in his 1865 book Pre-historic times, as illustrated by ancient remains, and the manners and customs of modern savages. He used it to refer to the final stage of the Stone Age and defined this period purely on the technology of the time, when humans had begun using polished stone tools but not yet started making metal tools. Lubbock's terminology was adopted by other archaeologists, but as they gained a greater understanding of later prehistory, it came to cover a wider set of characteristics. By the 20th century, when figures like V. Gordon Childe were working on the British Neolithic, the term "Neolithic" had been broadened to "include sedentary village life, cereal agriculture, stock rearing, and ceramics, all assumed characteristic of immigrant agriculturalists".

=== 20th and 21st centuries ===
In the 1960s, a number of British and American archaeologists began taking a new approach to their discipline by emphasising their belief that through the rigorous use of the scientific method, they could obtain objective knowledge about the human past. In doing so, they forged the theoretical school of processual archaeology. The processual archaeologists took a particular interest in the ecological impact on human society, and in doing so, the definition of "Neolithic" was "narrowed again to refer just to the agricultural mode of subsistence".

In the late 1980s, processualism began to come under increasing criticism by a new wave of archaeologists, who believed in the innate subjectivity of the discipline. The figures forged the new theoretical school of post-processual archaeology, and a number of post-processualists turned their attention to the Neolithic British Isles. They interpreted the Neolithic as an ideological phenomenon that was adopted by British, Irish and Manx society and led to them creating new forms of material-culture, such as the megalithic funerary and ceremonial monuments.

== Gallery ==
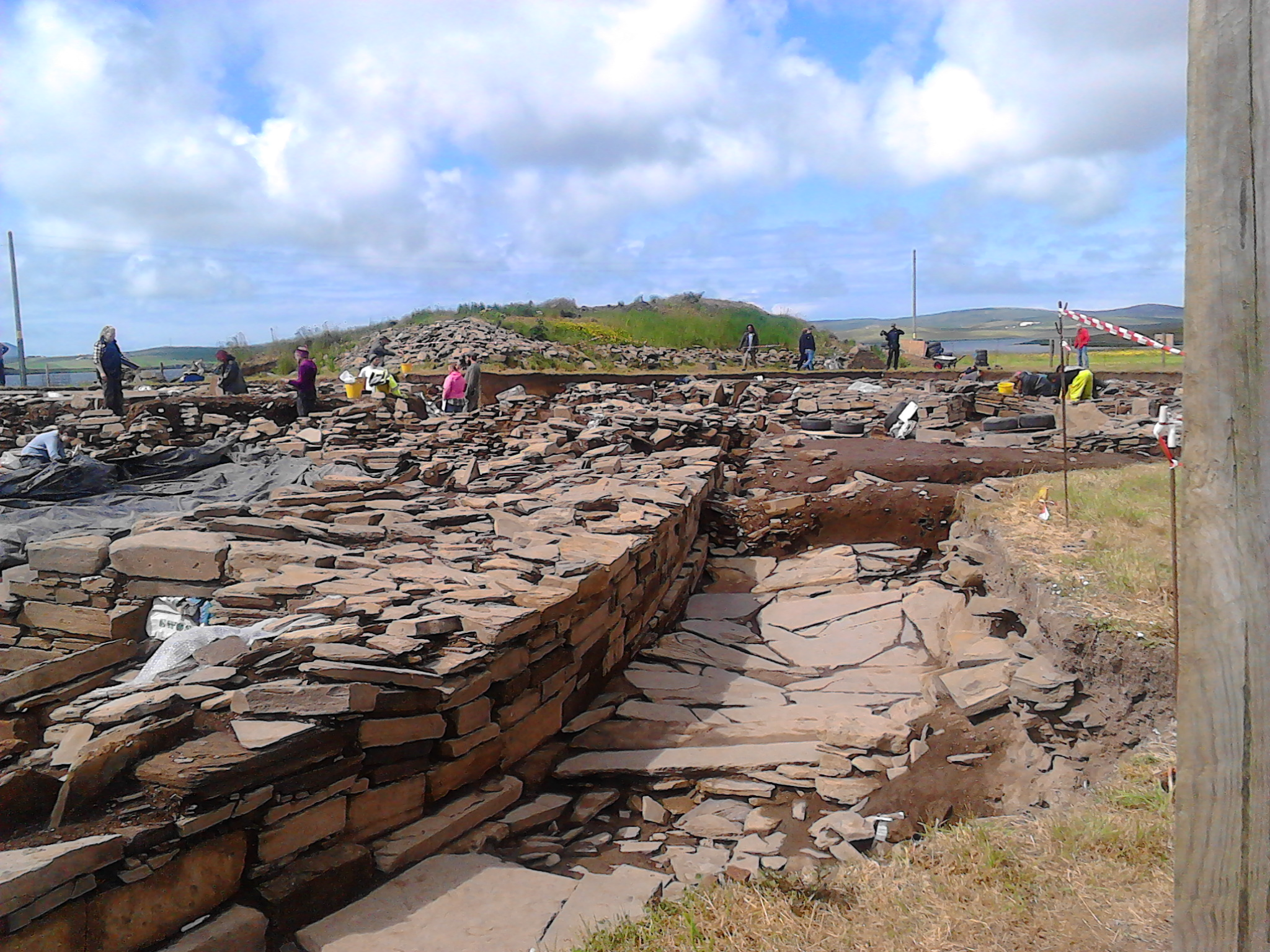
Ness of Brodgar, Orkney, Scotland, c. 3300-2800 BCE

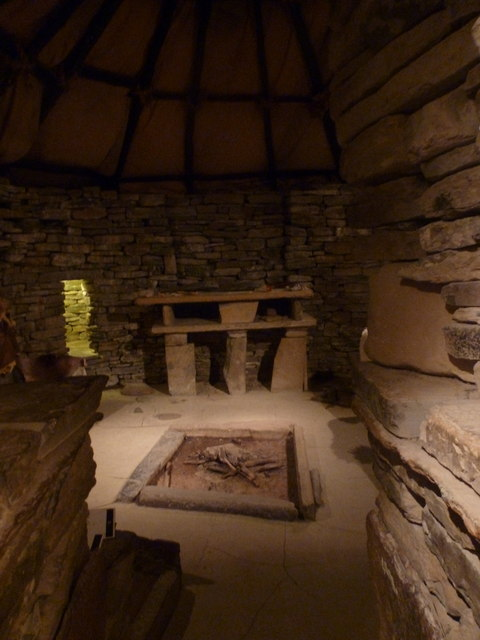
Reconstructed house interior at Skara Brae

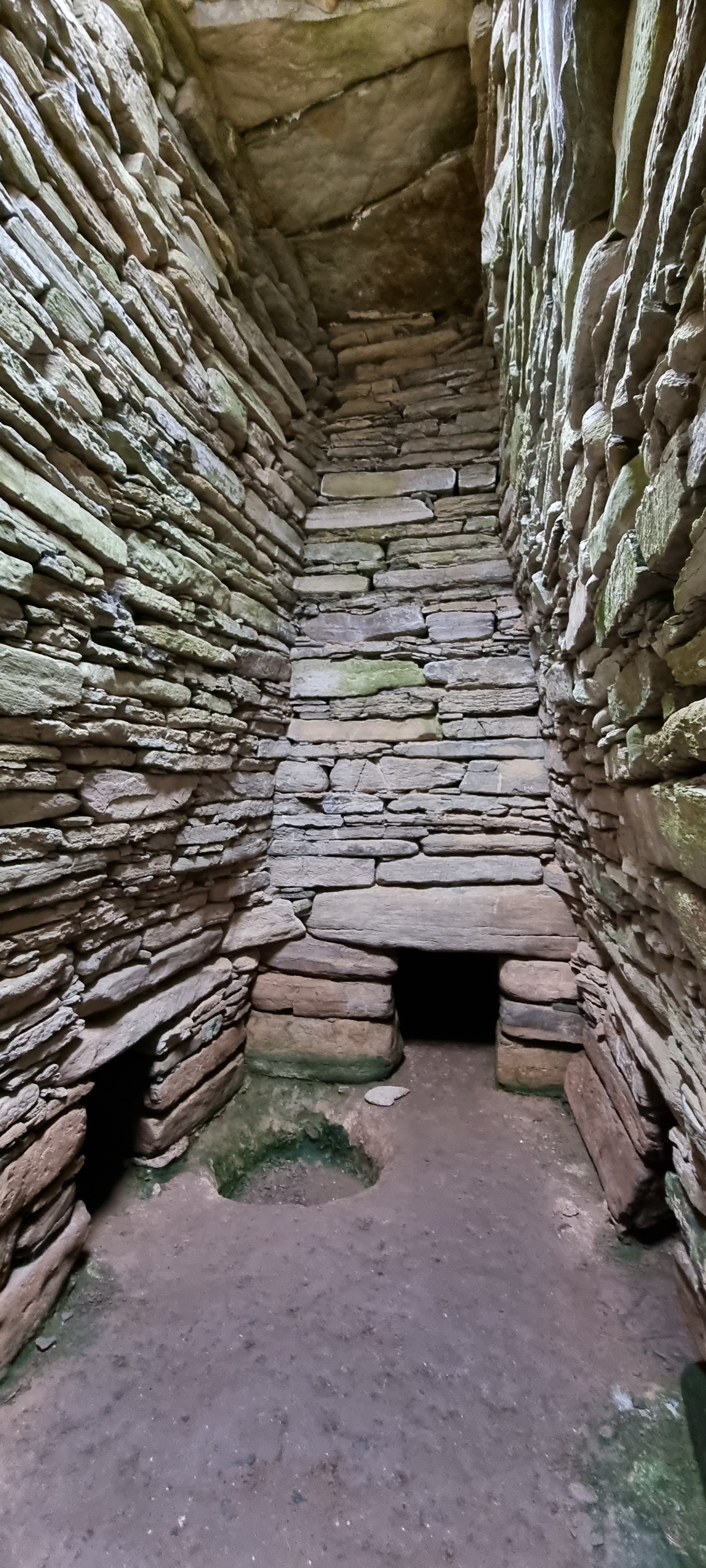
Quoyness chambered cairn, Orkney

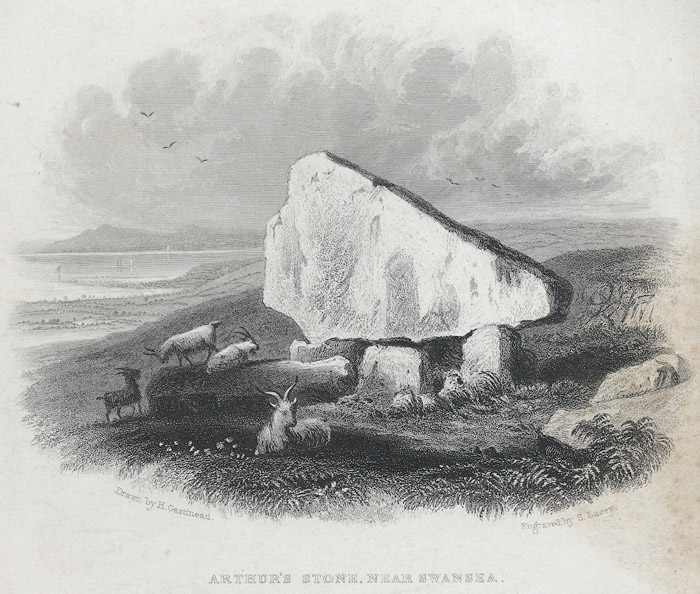
Maen Ceti (arthur stone) burial site, Gower, Wales.

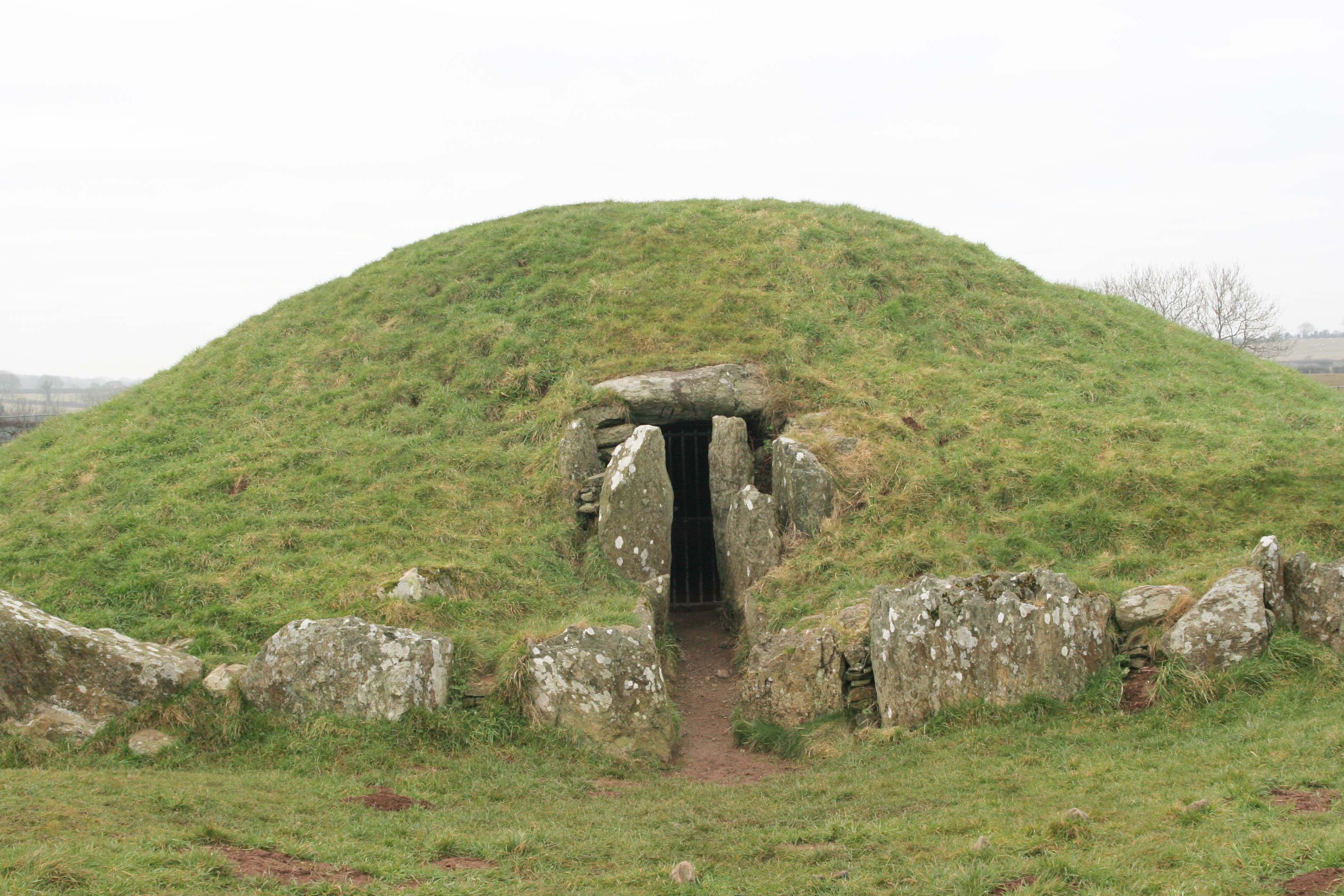
Bryn Celli Ddu, Wales

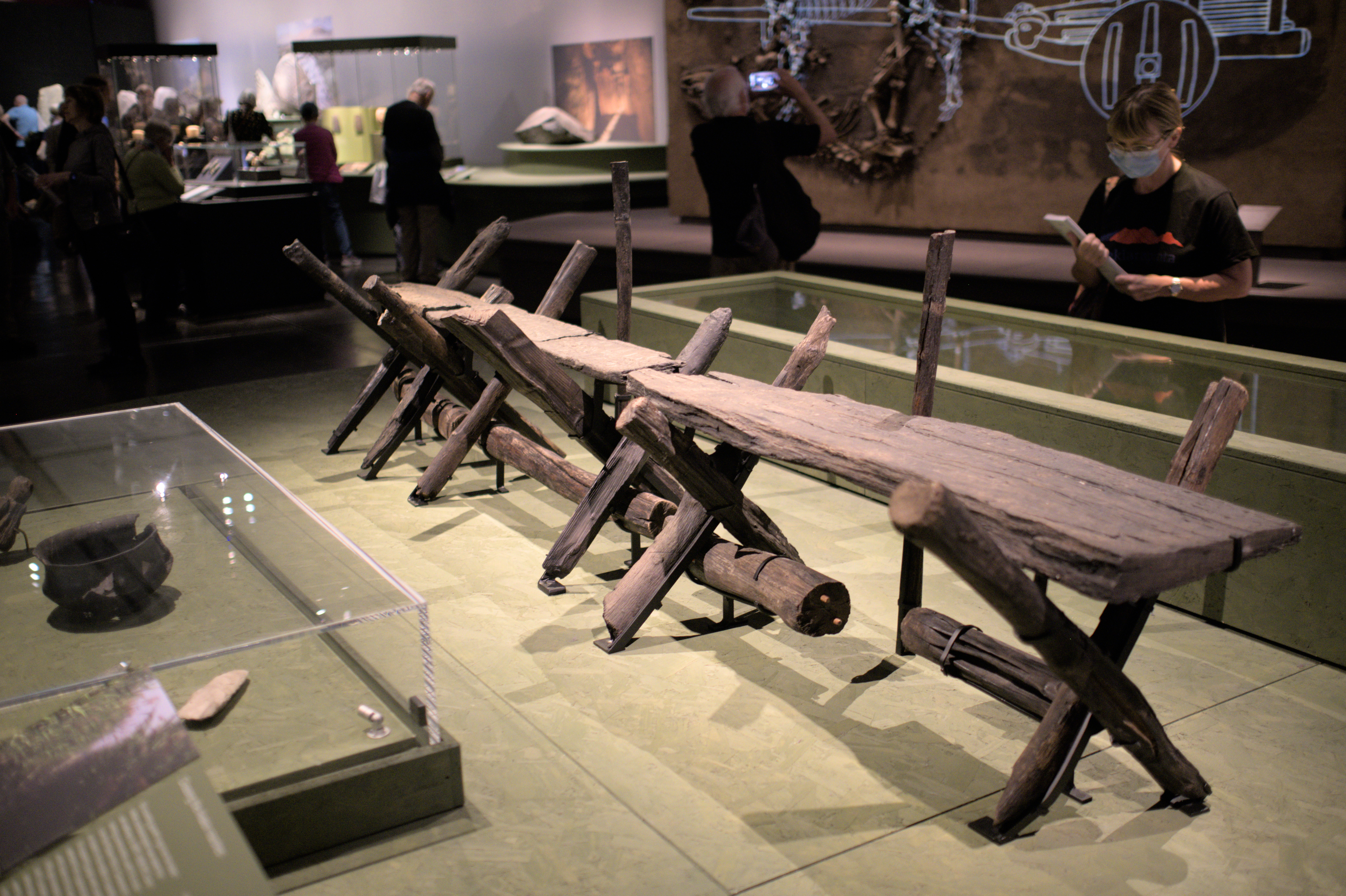
Part of the Sweet Track oak causeway, England, c. 3800 BC

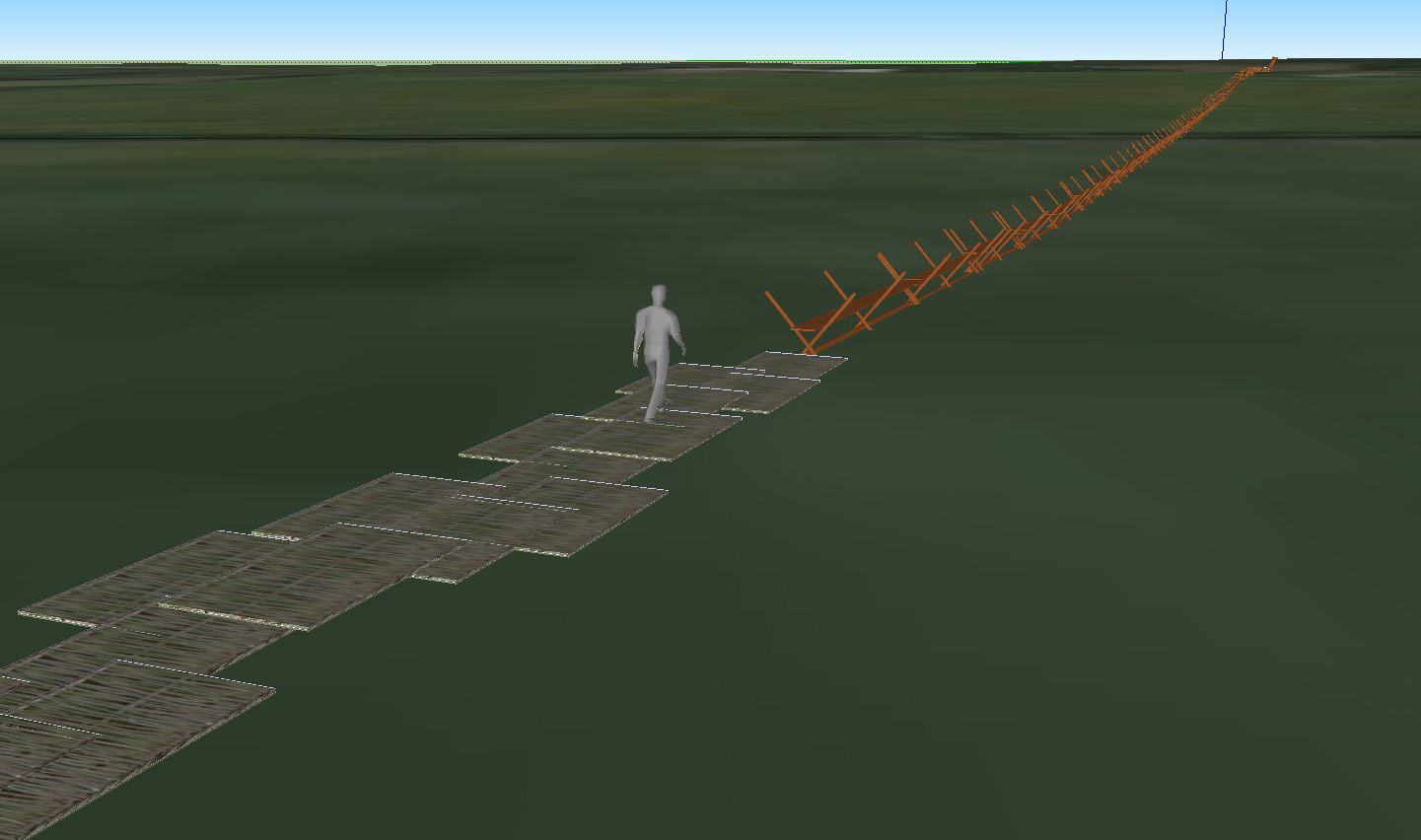
Reconstruction of the Sweet Track

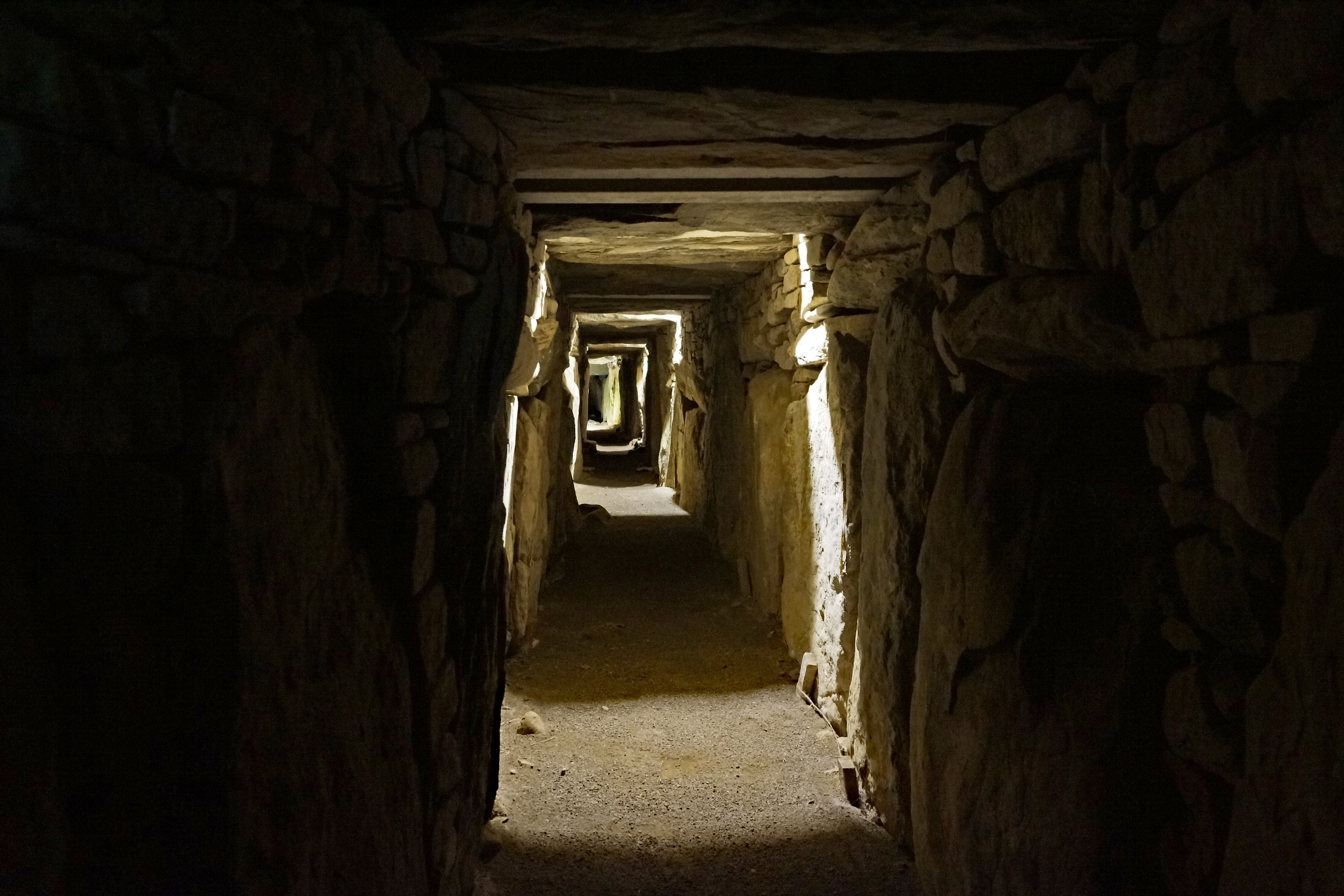
Knowth interior passage

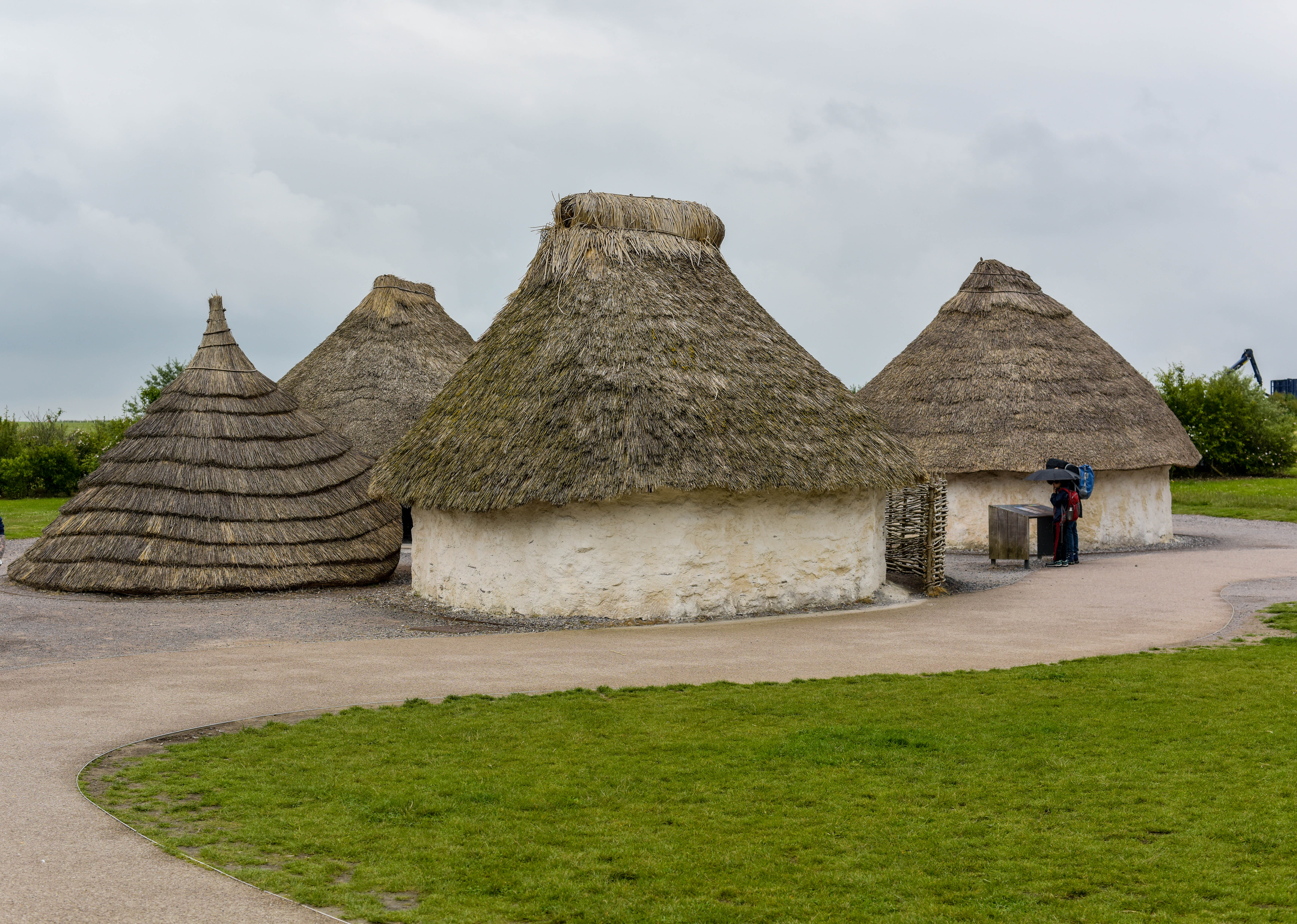
Reconstructed buildings at Stonehenge

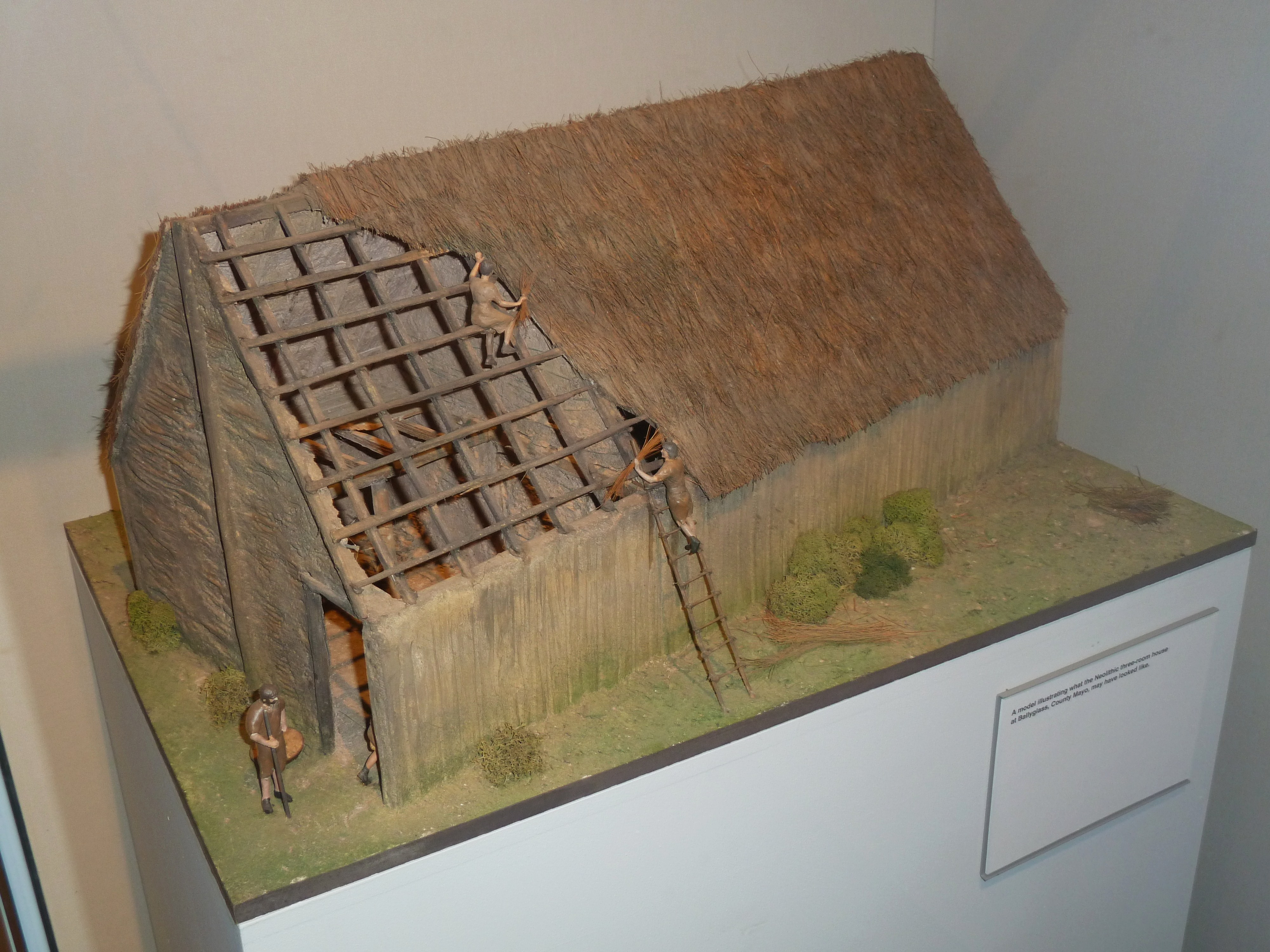
Model of a Neolithic house, Ireland

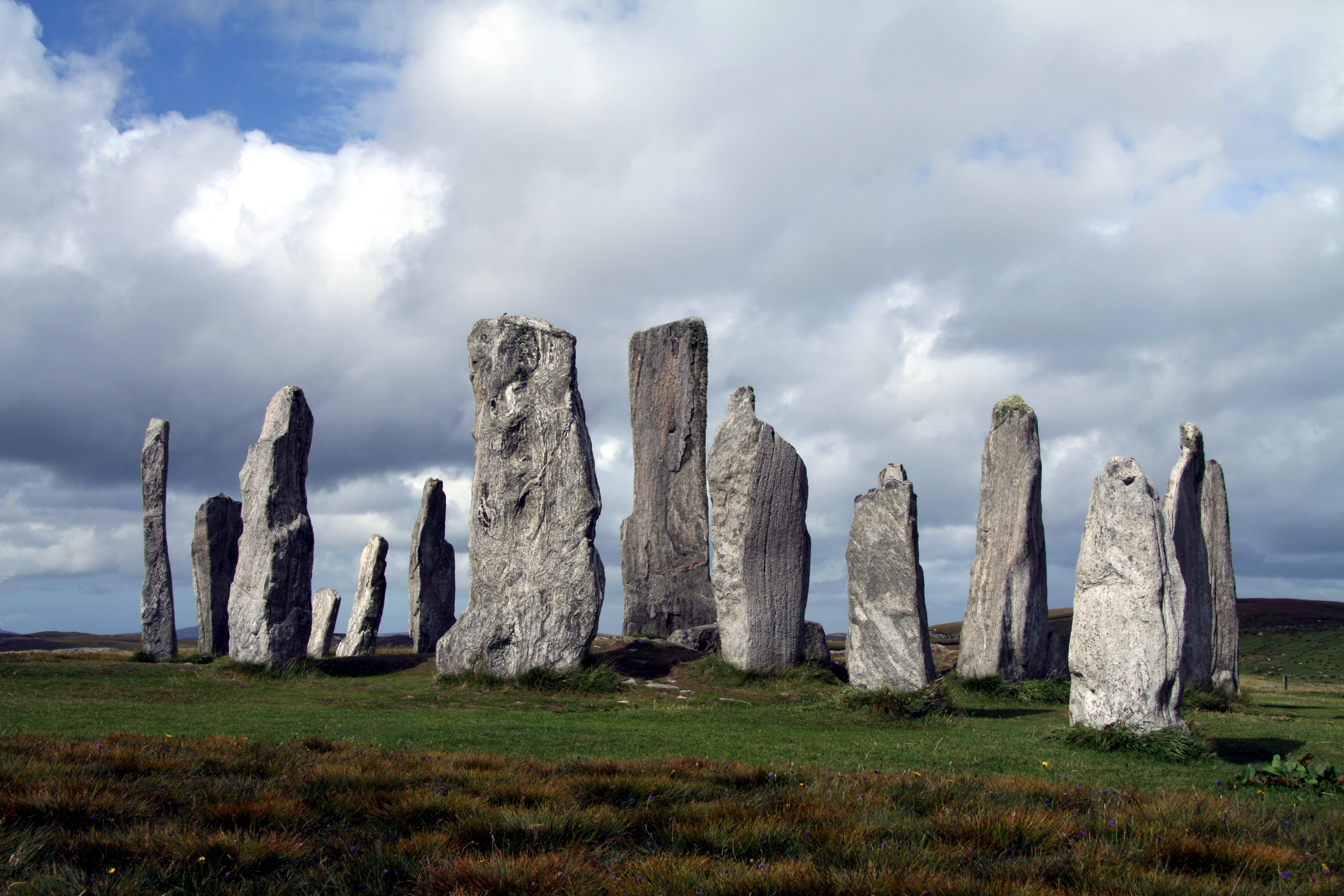
Callanish stones, Scotland

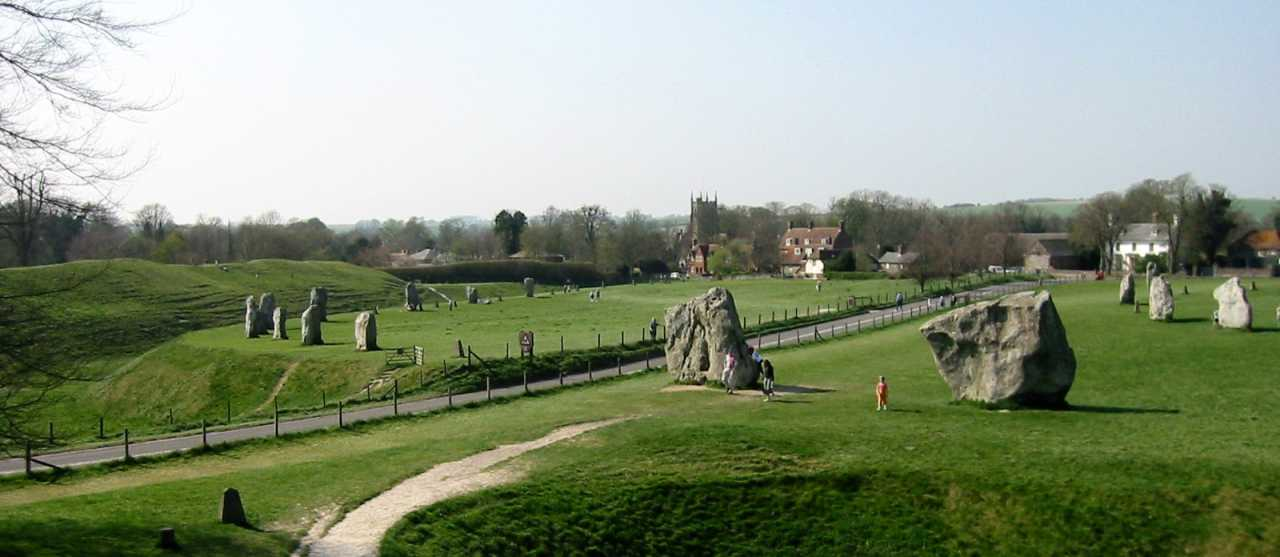
Avebury, England

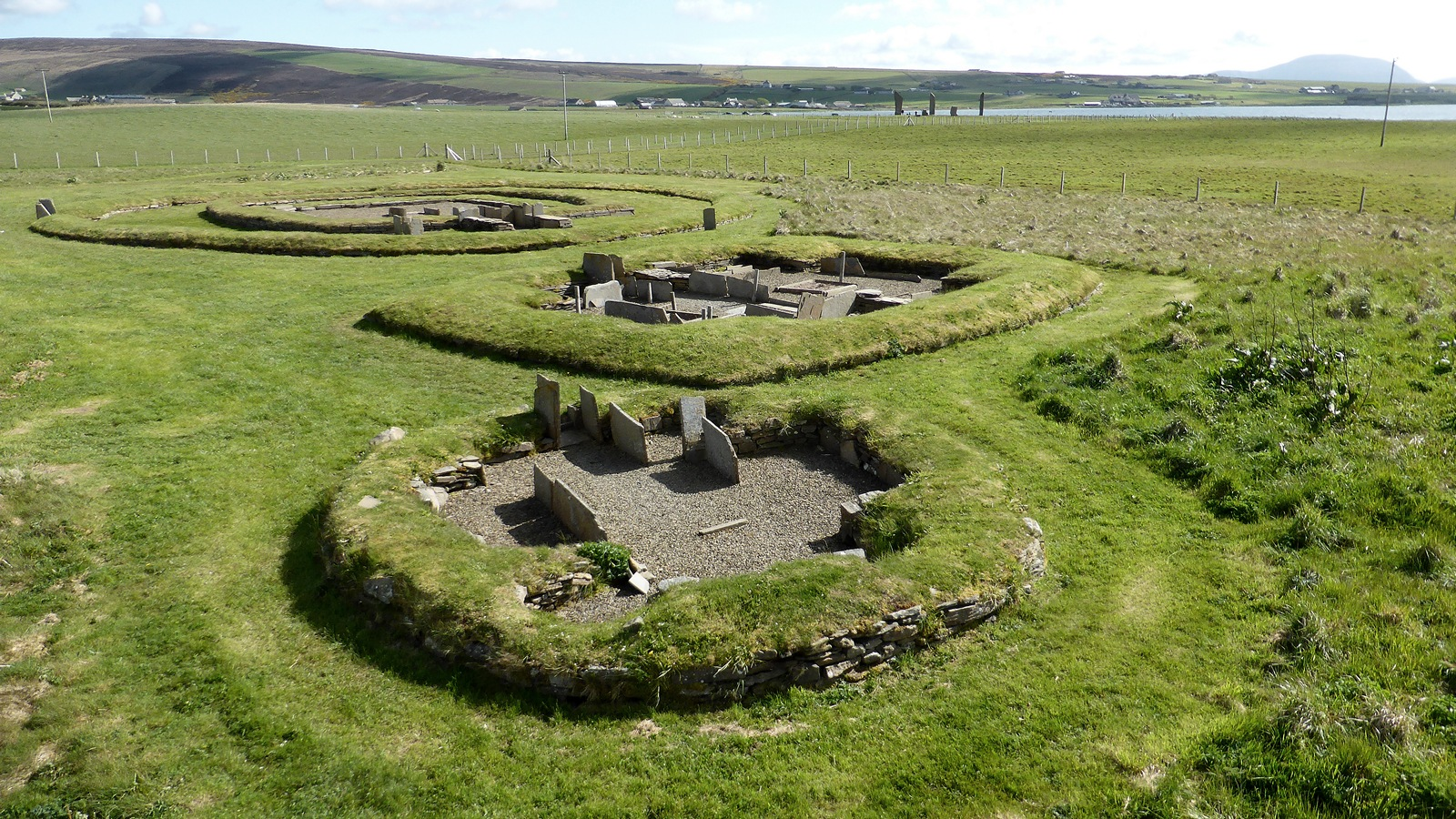
The Barnhouse Settlement, Orkney
