= Bush Barrow =

Bronze age site in Wiltshire, England

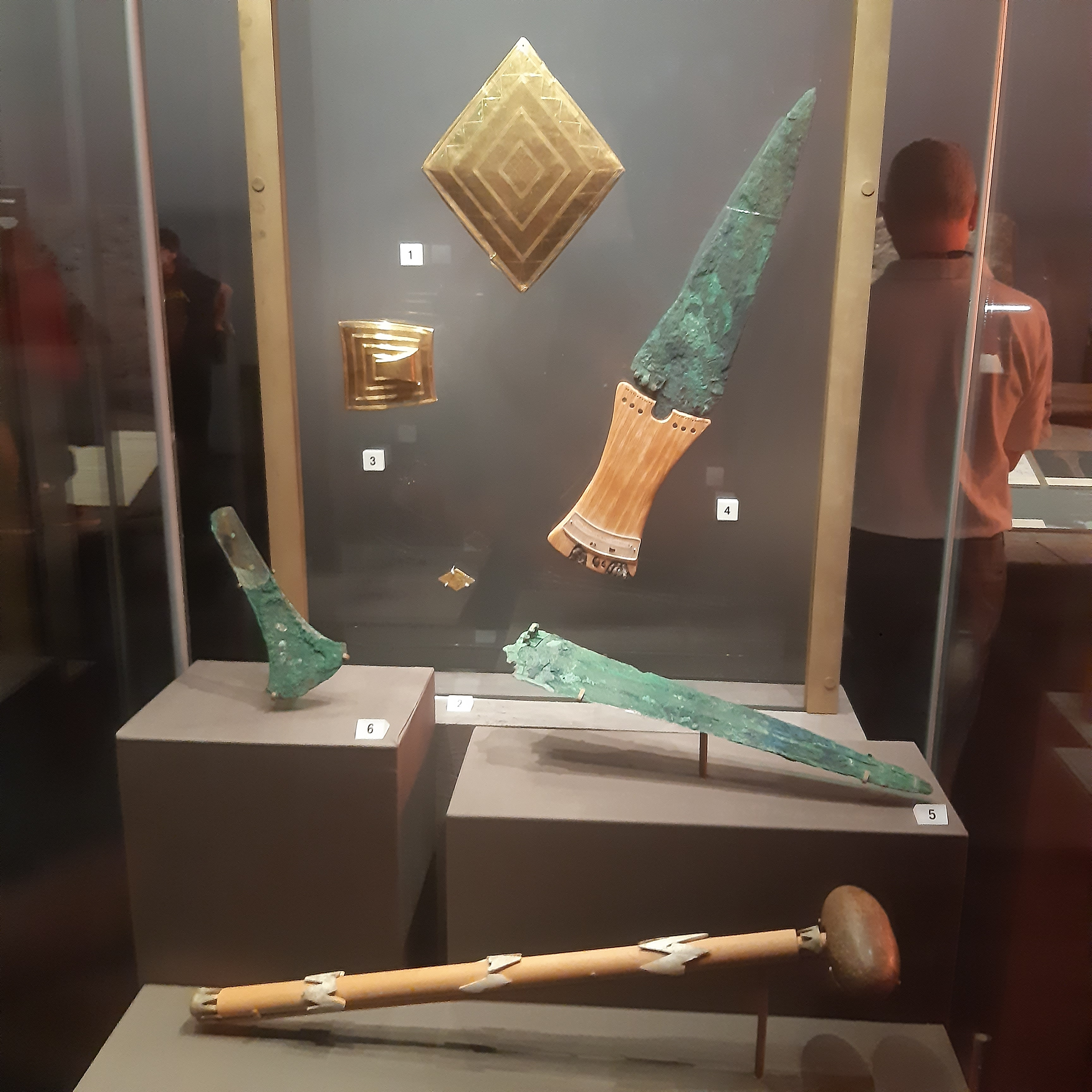
- Contents of the Bush Barrow on display at the British Museum

- Location within Wiltshire
- 51.17051°N 1.83482°W
- Type: Tumulus
- Periods: Bronze Age
- Location: grid reference SU11644126
- Part of: Normanton Down round barrow cemetery

Site notes
- Excavation dates: 1808
- Archaeologists: William Cunnington
- Owner: Private land
- Public access: No (but near a bridleway)

UNESCO World Heritage Site
- Official name: Stonehenge, Avebury and Associated Sites
- Type: Cultural
- Criteria: i, ii, iii
- Designated: 1986 (10th session)
- Reference no.: 373
- Region: Europe and North America

Scheduled monument
- Designated: 1925
- Reference no.: 1009618

Bush Barrow is a site of the early British Bronze Age Wessex culture (c. 1950 BC), at the western end of the Normanton Down Barrows ancient cemetery in Wiltshire, England. It is among the most important sites of the Stonehenge complex, having produced some of the most spectacular grave goods in Britain. It was excavated in 1808 by William Cunnington for Sir Richard Colt Hoare. The finds, including worked gold objects, are displayed at Wiltshire Museum in Devizes. The finds from Bush Barrow have been described as "the Crown Jewels of the King of Stonehenge".

== Description ==
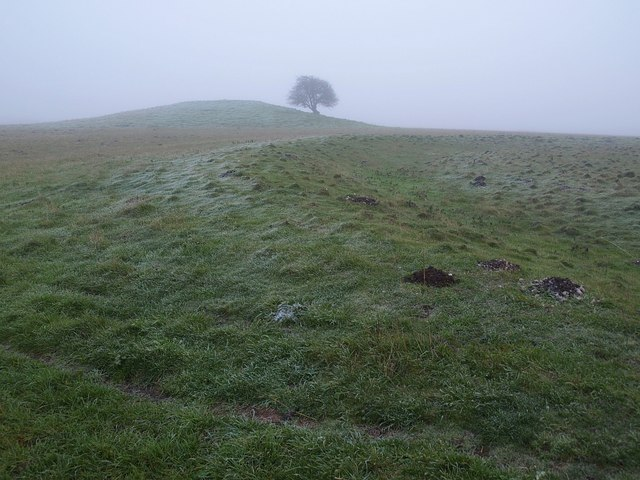
The Bush Barrow on Normanton Down, near Stonehenge

Bush Barrow lies around 1 kilometre southwest of Stonehenge on Normanton Down. It forms part of the Normanton Down Barrows cemetery. The surviving earthworks have an overall diameter of 49 metres (161 ft) and comprise a large mound, with breaks in the slope suggesting three phases of development. The barrow currently stands 3.3 metres high and its summit measures 10.5 metres in diameter.

The barrow is one of the "associated sites" in the World Heritage Site covering Stonehenge, Avebury and Associated Sites (Cultural, ID 373, 1986). The Normanton Down round barrow cemetery comprises some 40 barrows strung out along an east-west aligned ridge. Bush Barrow (so named by Cunnington because it had bushes on it) is towards the western end of the line of barrows, at the highest point of the ridge.

== Designation and access ==
The barrow was designated as a scheduled monument in 1925, at the same time as the rest of the Normanton Down cemetery.

The land is in private ownership, although a bridleway passes close to the west of the barrow. In 2010, it was within a nature conservation area with controlled numbers of livestock, where the Royal Society for the Protection of Birds had a project to encourage several species of rare birds to breed.

== Contents ==
The barrow was excavated in 1808 by William Cunnington for Sir Richard Colt Hoare. It contained a male skeleton, described as the 'Bush Barrow chieftain', with a collection of funerary goods that make it "the richest and most significant example of a Bronze Age burial monument not only in the Normanton group or in association with Stonehenge, but arguably in the whole of Britain". The items date the burial to the early Bronze Age, circa 1950 BC, and include a large 'lozenge'-shaped sheet of gold, a sheet gold belt plate, three bronze daggers, a bronze axe, a stone macehead and bronze rivets, all held by the Wiltshire Museum, Devizes.

=== Bush Barrow lozenge ===
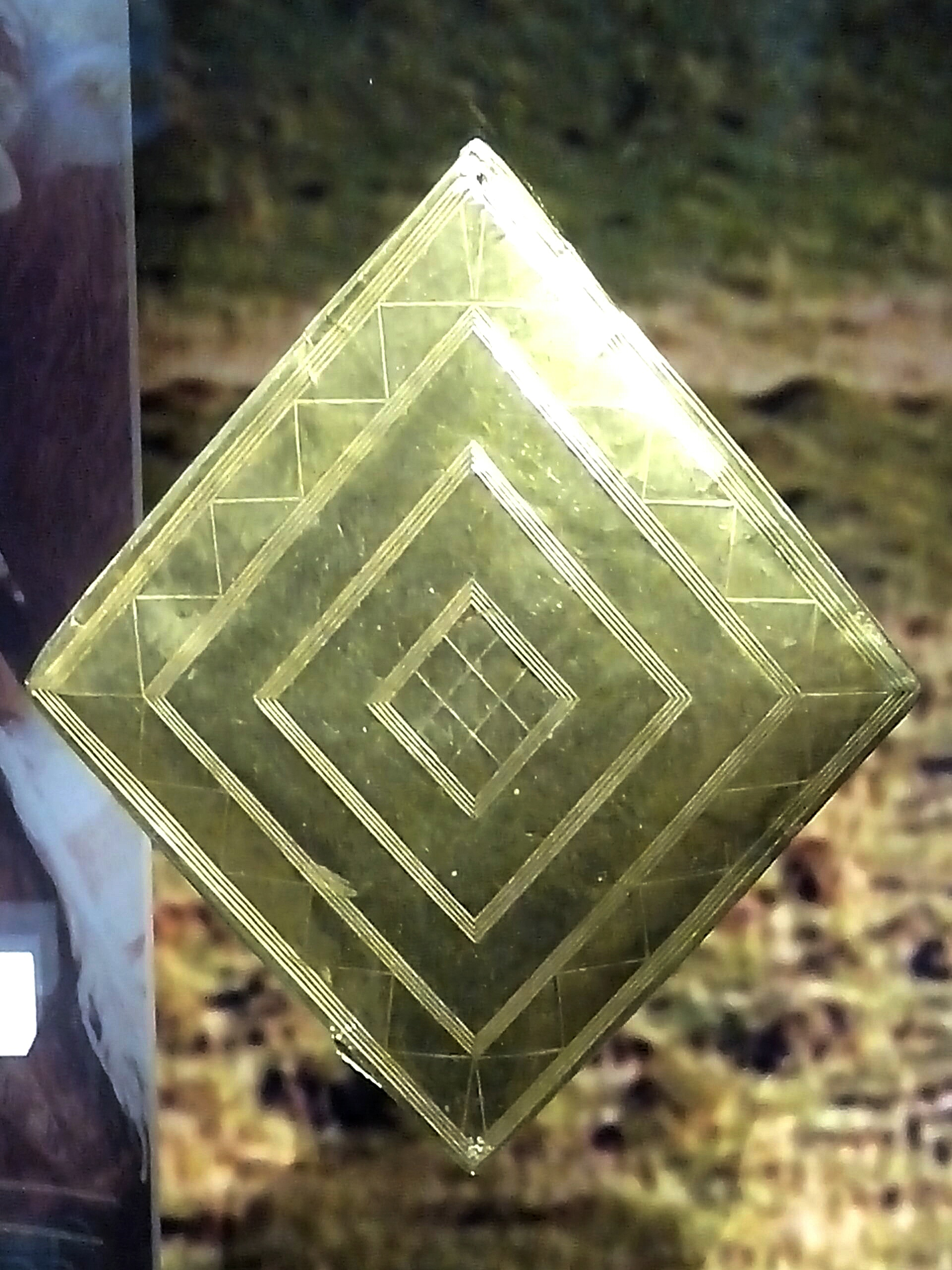
The Bush Barrow gold lozenge on display in Wiltshire Museum

The design of the artifact known as the Bush Barrow lozenge, and the smaller lozenge, has been shown to be based on a hexagon construction. The larger lozenge measures 184mm (7.24") long by 156mm (6.14") wide, and 1mm (0.039") thick. Both the shape and the decorative panels appear to have been created by repeating hexagons within a series of three concentric circles, each framing the series of smaller decorative panels. The precision and accuracy displayed by the work demonstrate both a sophisticated tool kit and a detailed knowledge of geometry. A similar gold lozenge from Clandon Barrow used a decagon in its design.

The design of the Bush Barrow lozenge also appears to have an astronomical meaning. The acute angles of the lozenge, measuring 81 degrees, correspond to the angle between the summer solstice and winter solstice as seen from the latitude of Stonehenge (51° north). When the sides of the lozenge are aligned with the solstices, the long axis of the lozenge also points to the equinox sunrise. According to David Dawson, director of the Wiltshire Museum, the design and precision of the Bush Barrow lozenge shows that its makers "understood astronomy, geometry and mathematics, 4,000 years ago."

Similarities have been noted between the Bush Barrow lozenge and the roughly contemporary Nebra sky disc, which depicts the angle between the solstices at the latitude of the Mittelberg hill in central Germany where the disc was found. The archaeologist Euan MacKie has suggested that the Bush Barrow Lozenge and Nebra disc "both seem to be designed to reflect the annual solar cycle at about latitude 51° north."

According to the archaeologist Sabine Gerloff, the design of the lozenge indicates "a continuation of some megalithic traditions, beliefs and cult practices into the Early Bronze Age". The archaeologist Anthony Johnson considers that the understanding of geometry displayed by the Bush Barrow lozenge has its origins in the preceding megalithic culture. Euan Mackie also suggests a megalithic origin for the knowledge of astronomy indicated by its design, which he attributes to the possible existence of a 'priesthood' in both the Neolithic and early Bronze Age. Lozenges are common on megalithic petroglyphs and Grooved Ware pottery, and are also depicted on the Folkton Drums, which may represent measuring devices used in the construction of Stonehenge and other megalithic monuments. Lozenges are similarly depicted on Bell Beaker pottery and on Irish gold lunulae.

Some authors have suggested that the lozenge form represents a female goddess, along with associated concepts of fertility and maternity. Support for this is provided by depictions of lozenges on Neolithic figurines from continental Europe (interpreted as possible 'goddess figurines'), where they may have represented wombs or vulvas, as well as on 'snake goddess' figurines from Minoan Crete. The researcher Claude Maumené has further suggested that the lines and shapes on the Bush Barrow lozenge may numerically encode a Venus calendar, which he connects to these symbolic interpretations.

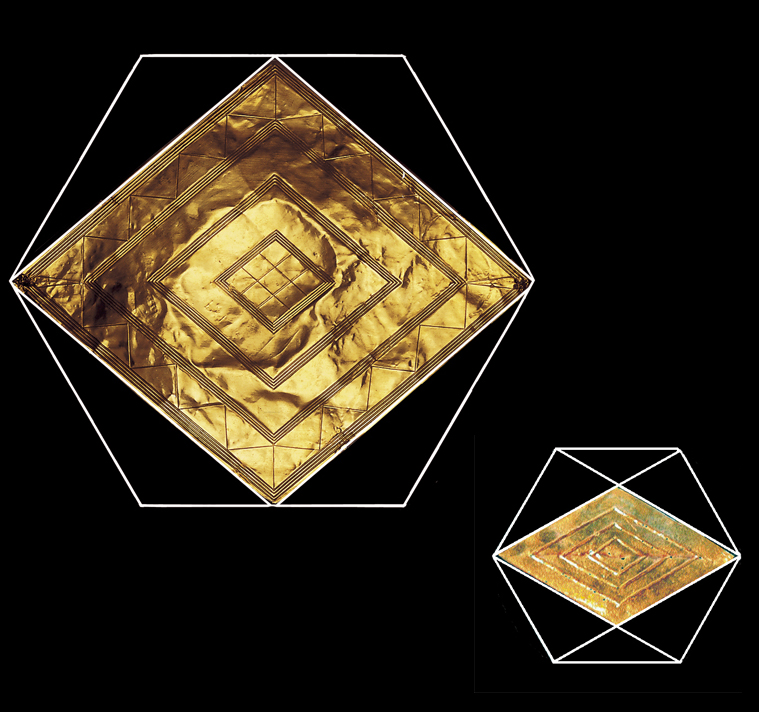
Hexagon geometry was employed in both lozenge forms

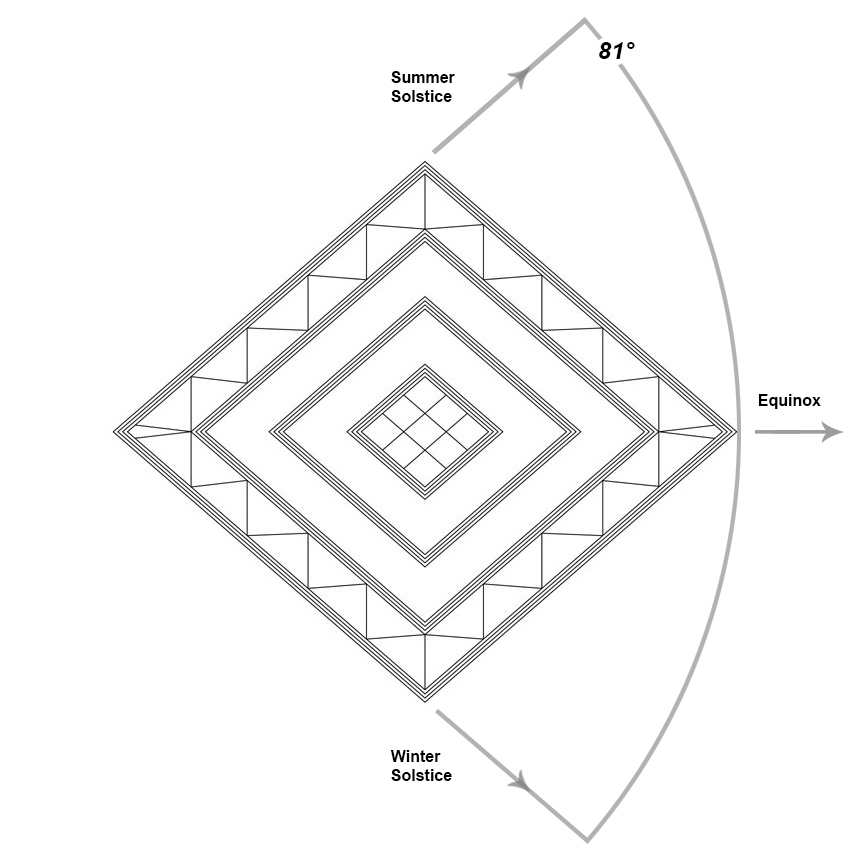
Design, angles and alignments of the Bush Barrow lozenge

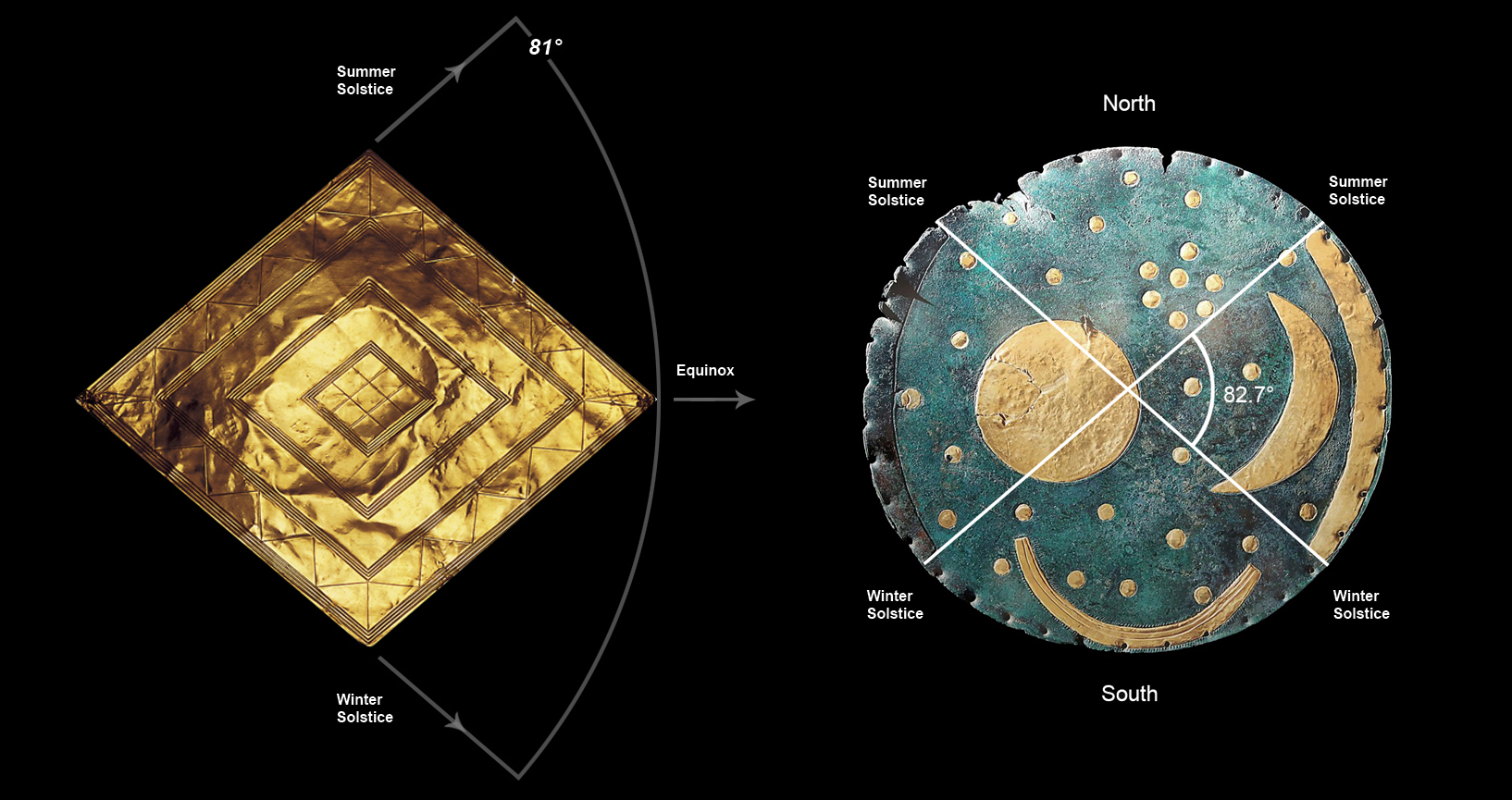
Comparison of the Bush Barrow lozenge and Nebra sky disc

=== Daggers ===
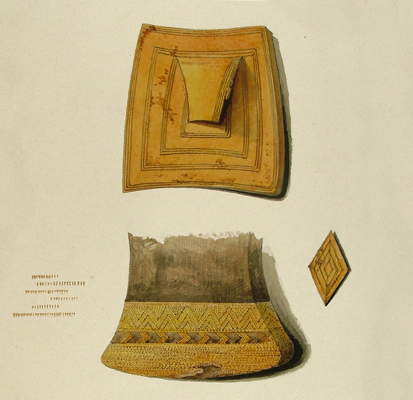
19th-century illustration of the Bush Barrow dagger hilt with gold stud decoration, gold belt-plate and small gold lozenge

Two of the bronze daggers have the largest blades of any from their period, whilst a third had a 30 centimetres (12 in) long wooden hilt originally decorated with up to 140,000 tiny gold studs forming a herringbone pattern. The studs are around 0.2 millimetres (0.0079 in) wide and 1 millimetre (0.039 in) in length, with over a thousand studs embedded in each square centimetre. David Dawson has stated that: "The gold studs are remarkable evidence of the skill and craftsmanship of Bronze Age goldsmiths – quite rightly described as 'the work of the gods'". He went on to say that "Only children and teenagers, and those adults who had become myopic naturally or due to the nature of their work as children, would have been able to create and manufacture such tiny objects."

External image
- Photo of gold studs from the Bush Barrow dagger

Scientific analyses indicate that the gold originated from Cornwall. This was also the source of gold used to make the Nebra sky disc and Irish gold lunulae.

The dagger may have been made in either Britain or Brittany (Armorica), where similar examples of gold-stud decoration are known. Gold-stud decoration was also used on the amber pommel of a dagger from Hammeldon Down Barrow in Devon, dating from the Wessex II period.

The hilt of the Bush Barrow dagger lay forgotten for over 40 years from the 1960s, having been sent to Professor Atkinson at Cardiff University, and was found by one of his successors in 2005.

=== Antique knife ===
Some bronze rivets and other bronze fragments have been identified as the remains of a knife dating from about 2400 BC, suggesting that the Bush Barrow chieftain may have belonged to a "noble dynasty" dating back to the time of Stonehenge's construction. He may have also been a 'priest' in control of rituals at Stonehenge.

=== Stone mace ===
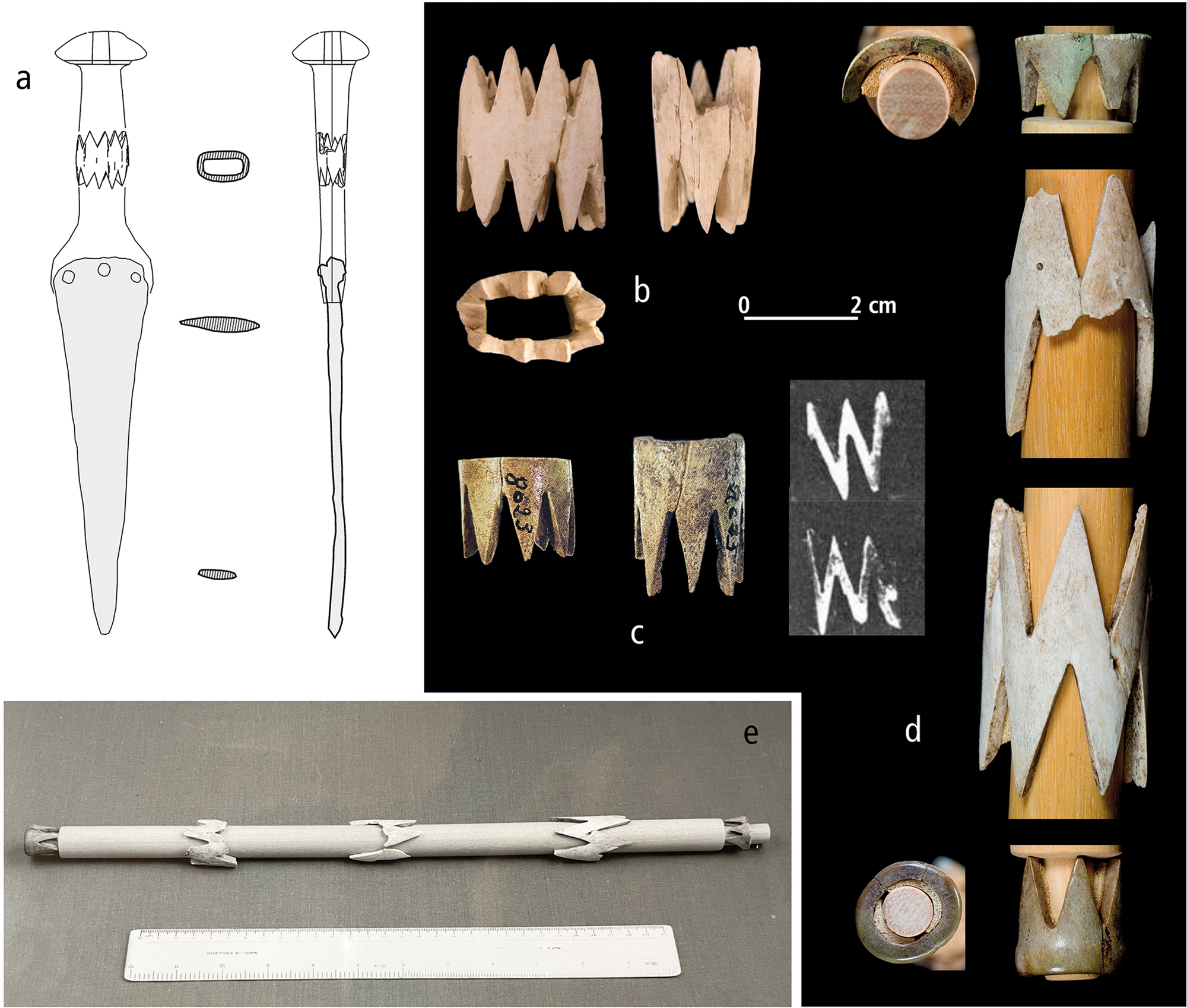
Ivory and bone mounts from Bush Barrow (d, e), Illeta dels Banyets (a, b), and Mycenae (c)

An unusual stone macehead lay to the right of the Bush Barrow skeleton, made out of a rare fossilized stromatoporoid (sea sponge), originating in Devon or Cornwall. It had a wooden handle, from which decorative zig-zag-shaped bone mounts survive. The mace is considered to be a symbol of power or authority. Similar bone mounts have been found in Grave Circle B at Mycenae in Greece, at Illeta dels Banyets in Spain (associated with the Argaric culture), and in gold at Carnac in Brittany (associated with the Bell Beaker culture).

The excavator of Bush Barrow, William Cunnington, suggested a connection between the stone macehead and the supposed beliefs and practices of the later Druids as described by the Roman author Pliny the Elder.

=== Connections with Greece ===
Various authors have suggested a connection between the bone mounts from Bush Barrow and those in Greece, where they appear without local antecedents. This is supported by the finding of amber necklaces from Britain in the elite shaft graves at Mycenae (Grave circles A and B). According to the archaeologist Joseph Maran:

"In Greece, amber objects first make their appearance in the seventeenth or sixteenth centuries BCE at the very beginning of the Mycenaean period. ... the amber objects had not reached Greece from the Baltic, but, mostly as finished products, from the area of the Wessex culture of southern England. ... There is an amazing similarity between the shaft grave period and the Wessex culture not only in the amber items as such and their close association with gold, but also in the social contexts of the appearance of amber jewellery … in both regions such special amber objects were confined to the very small group of the most richly furnished burials.”

Amber may have been imported to Britain from Scandinavia in exchange for metal.

Close similarities have also been noted between the gold-stud decoration of the Bush Barrow dagger and the decoration of elite weapons in Mycenaean Greece. The gold-stud technique is exclusively attested in Britain, Armorica and Greece, with the oldest examples coming from Britain and Armorica. In Greece this technique, known as 'gold embroidery', first appears in the shaft graves at Mycenae. According to the archaeologist Nikolas Papadimitriou, "Mycenaean gold embroidery first occurred in the same context as two other types of artefacts that are considered indicative of northern European links: amber spacer-plates with complex boring and weapons with in-laid decoration." Sabine Gerloff argues that the gold-stud technique originated in Britain and was transferred to Greece, along with amber necklaces and zig-zag and lozenge-shaped decorative elements, including the bone mounts from Mycenae. These contacts were, according to Gerloff, related to the supply of tin from Britain.

According to Joseph Maran the route of these contacts was through western and/or central Europe and the central Mediterranean. Sabine Gerloff has suggested that contact routes passed "primarily along the Middle and Upper Rhine, Switzerland, the Alps to the Caput Adriae as well as down the Rhone.”

According to Gerloff the gold plating and metal-inlay techniques used on the Nebra sky disc and related artefacts (such as the Thun-Renzenbühl axe from Switzerland) also have their origin in Britain, whilst being "generally connected to Mycenaean metalwork". Daniel Berger and colleagues (2013) have also suggested that the Mycenaean metal-inlay technique known as 'double-damascening' may have originated in northwestern or central Europe.

Connections between Greece and the Early Bronze Age cultures of Western Europe may have originally been established during the Bell Beaker period, c. 2200-2000 BC, when Bell Beaker-related artefacts such as pottery and archers' wristguards are found in Greece and the Aegean region, likely due to a Bell Beaker-related migration into the area.

== Wider context ==
Boundary of the Stonehenge and Avebury World Heritage Site, with the location of Bush Barrow

It is not known why this barrow contained such rich grave goods compared to those around it. It occupies the highest point, but is not the tallest barrow, and is not obviously marked out as the principal barrow in the cemetery. Nonetheless, several other barrows within the Normanton Group contain similarly rich grave goods associated with primary interments, also of a similar age.

=== Gallery ===
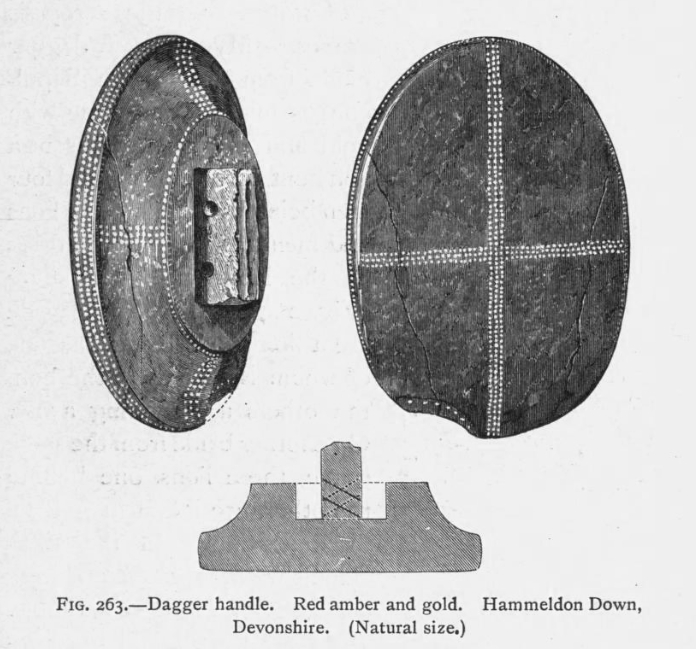
Dagger pommel from Hammeldon Down, made from amber with gold stud decoration in the form of a sun cross

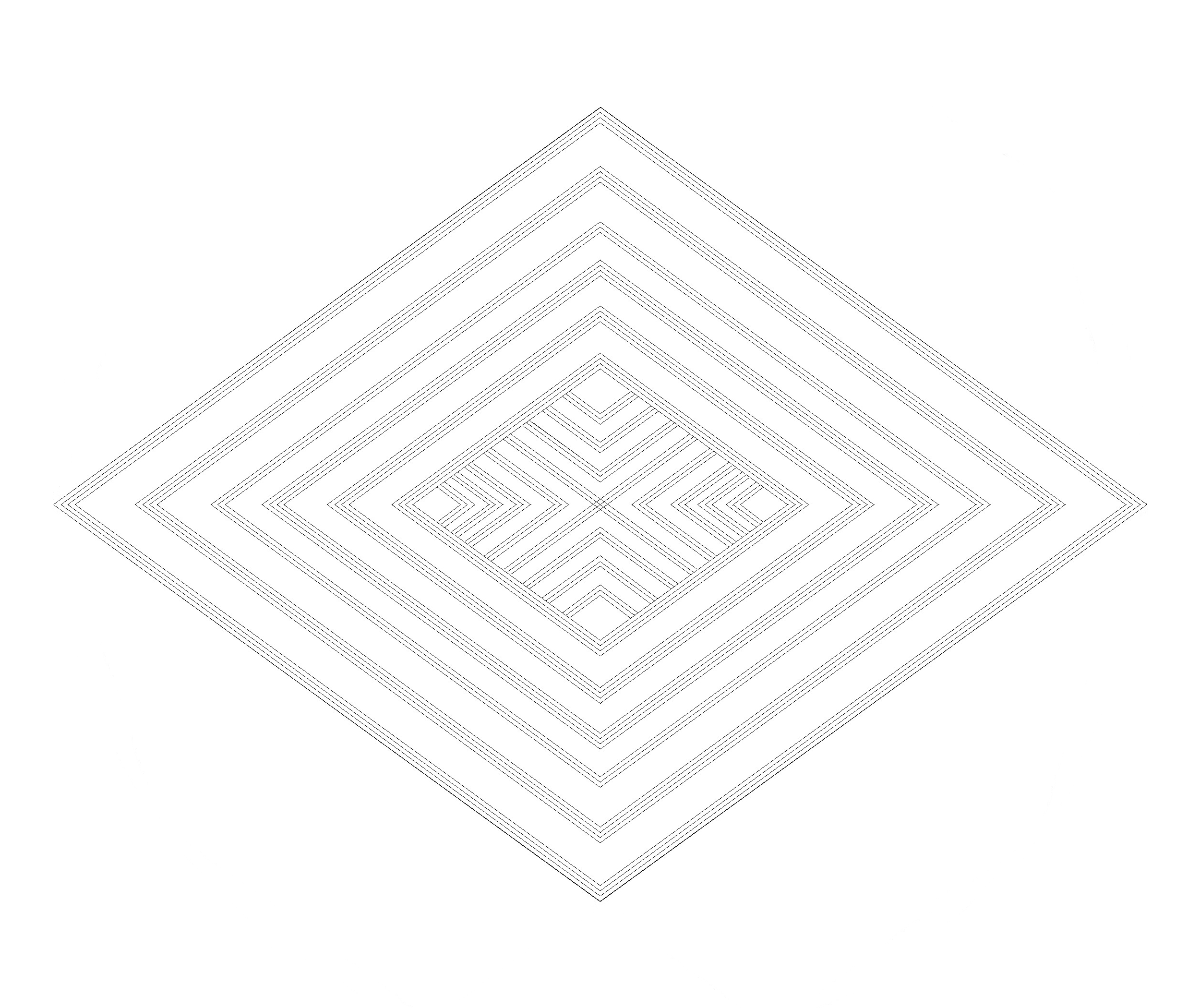
Diagram of the Clandon Barrow gold lozenge showing its geometric construction

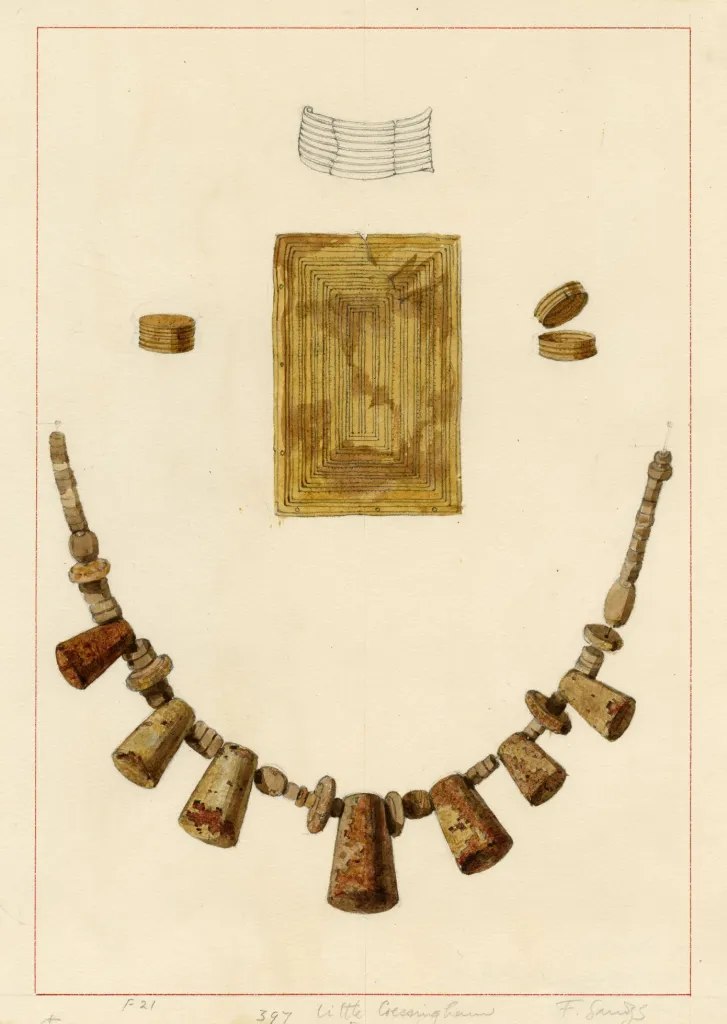
Rectangular gold plaque and amber necklace from Little Cressingham

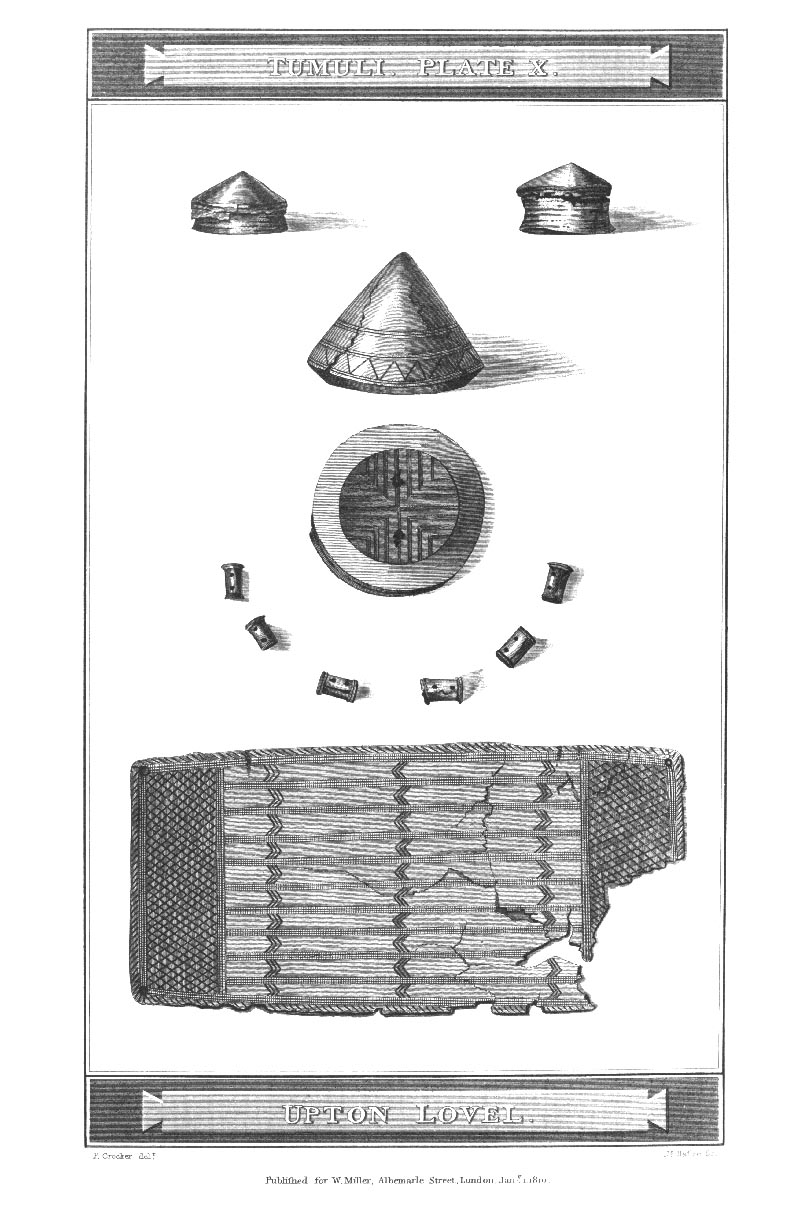
Gold plaque and other gold items from Upton Lovell

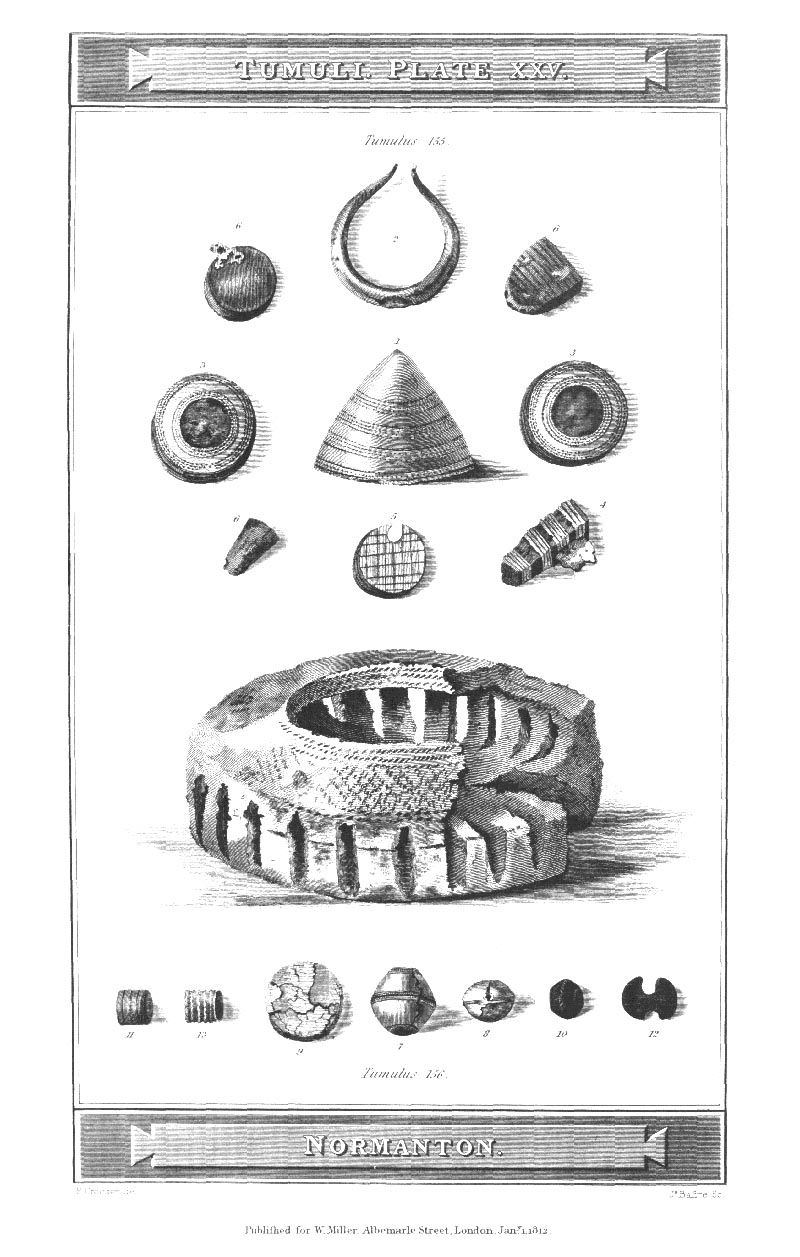
Gold and amber ornaments and ceramic incense burner from Normanton Down

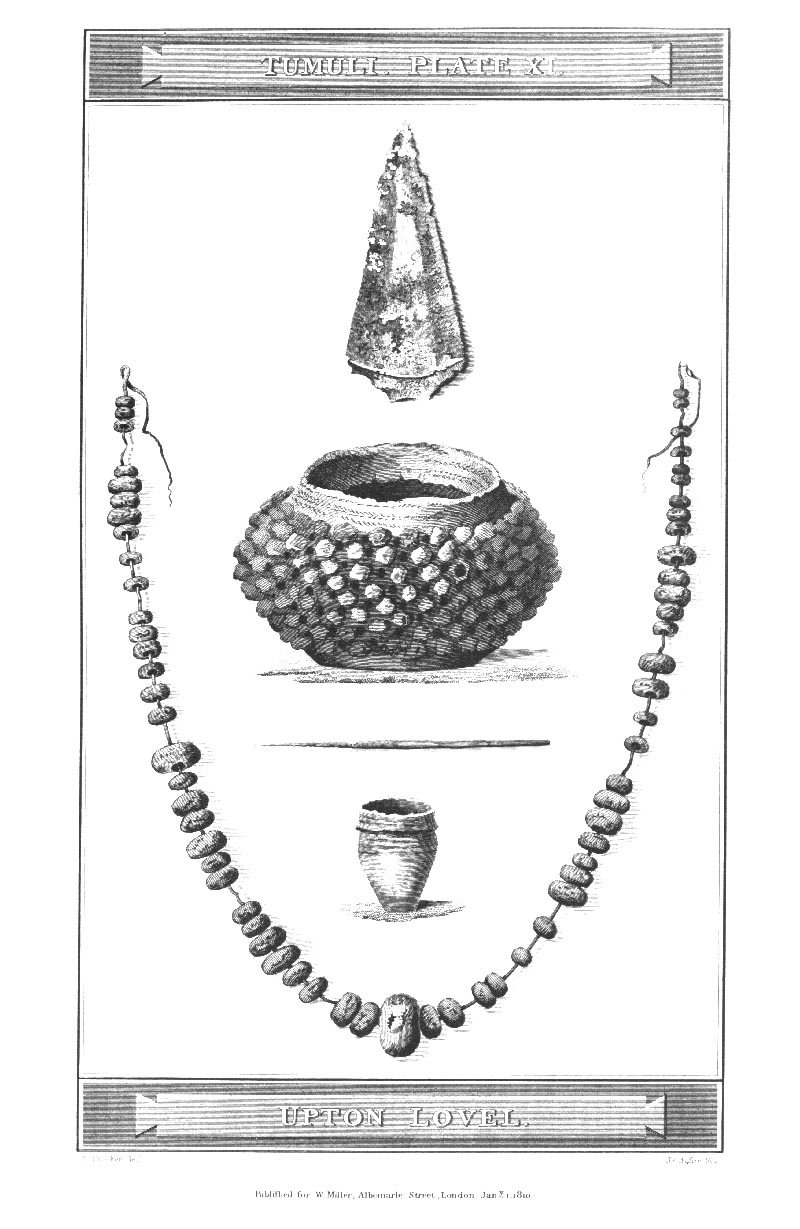
Burial goods from Upton Lovell

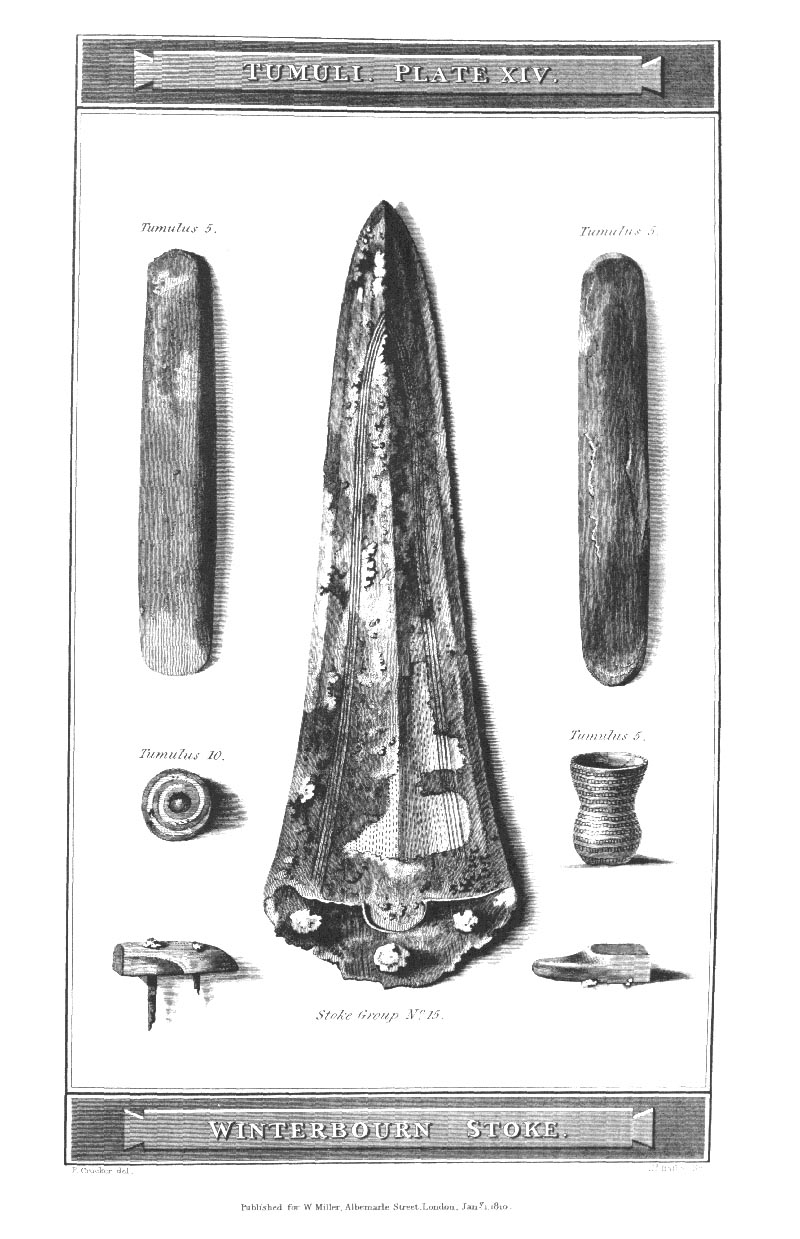
Burial goods from Winterbourn Stoke

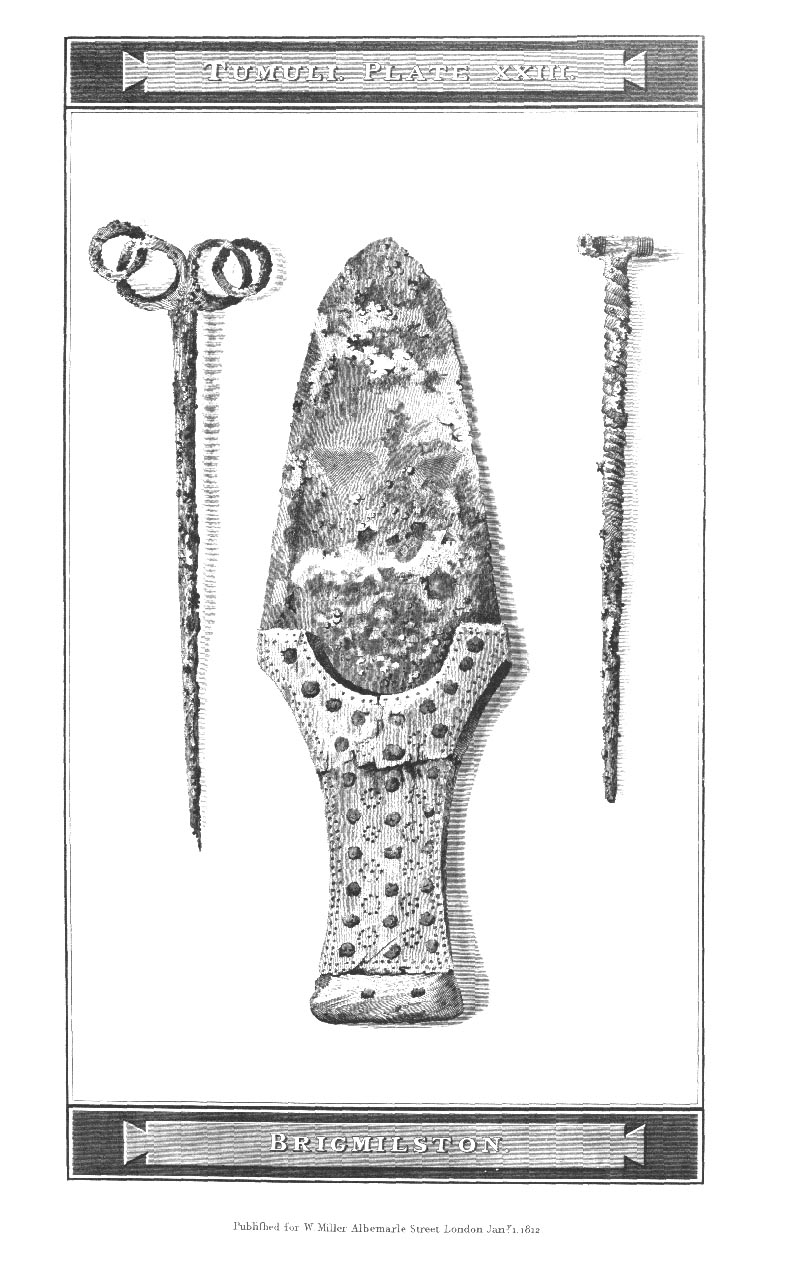
Burial goods from Brigmilston

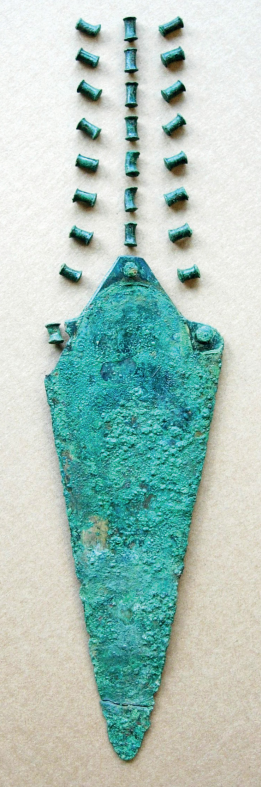
Bronze dagger from Racton

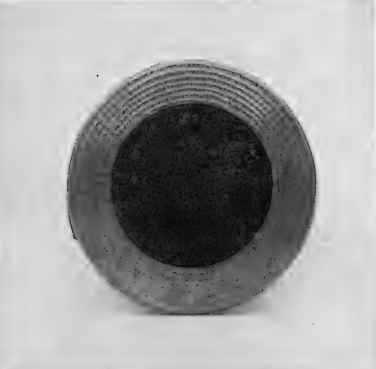
Amber disc in gold setting from Manton Barrow, Avebury

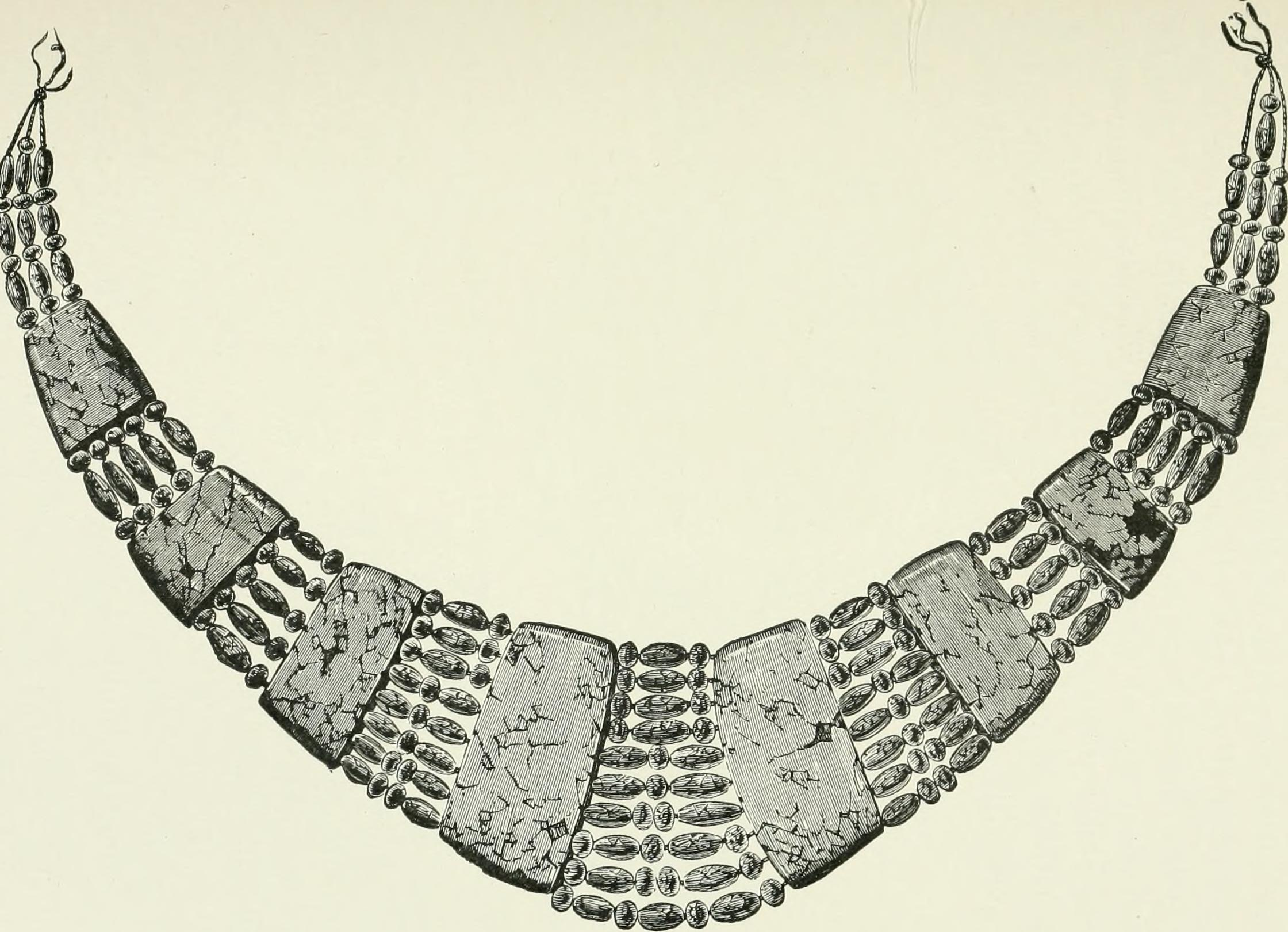
Amber necklace from Lake, Wiltshire

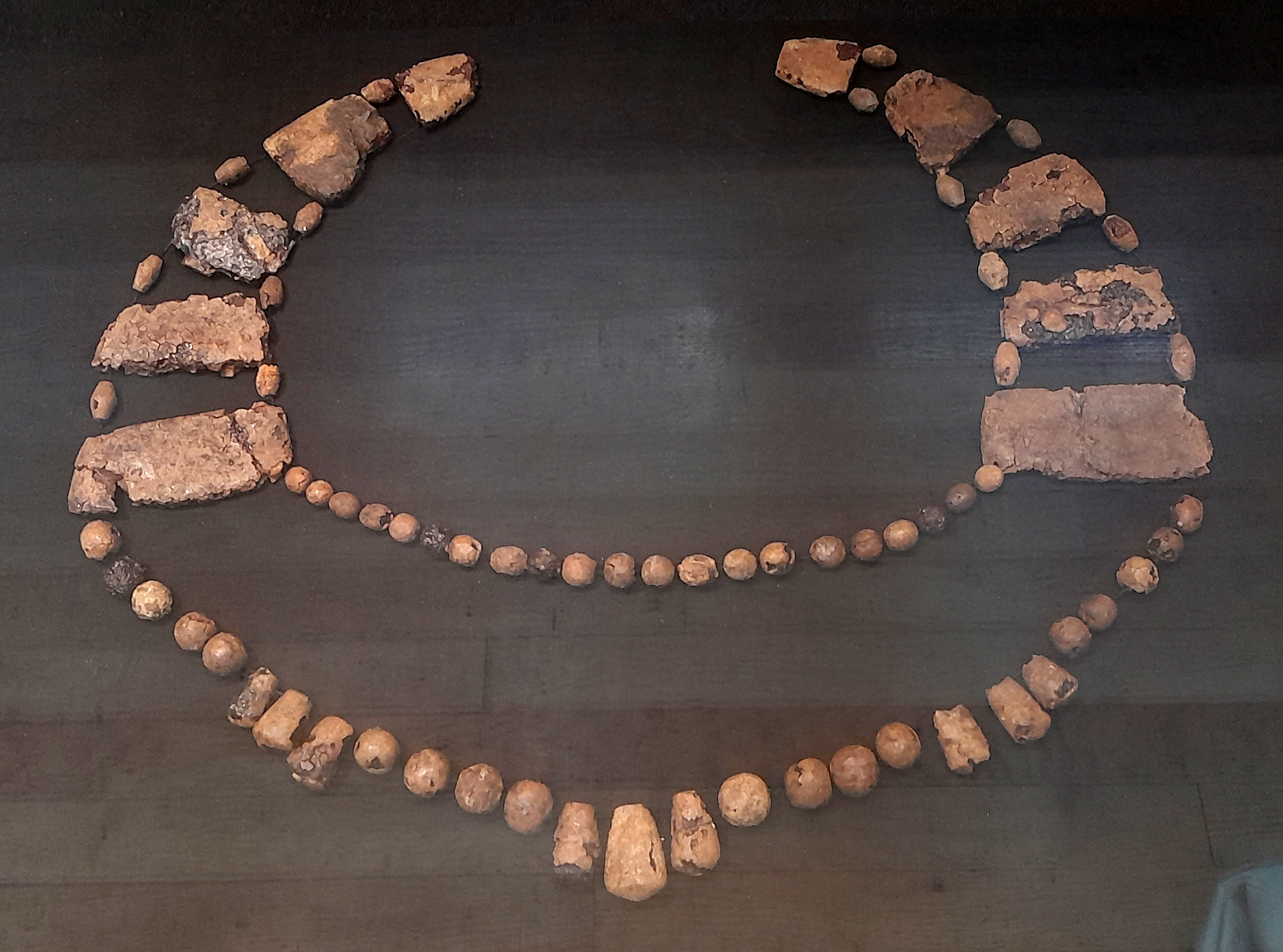
Amber necklace from Lake, Wiltshire

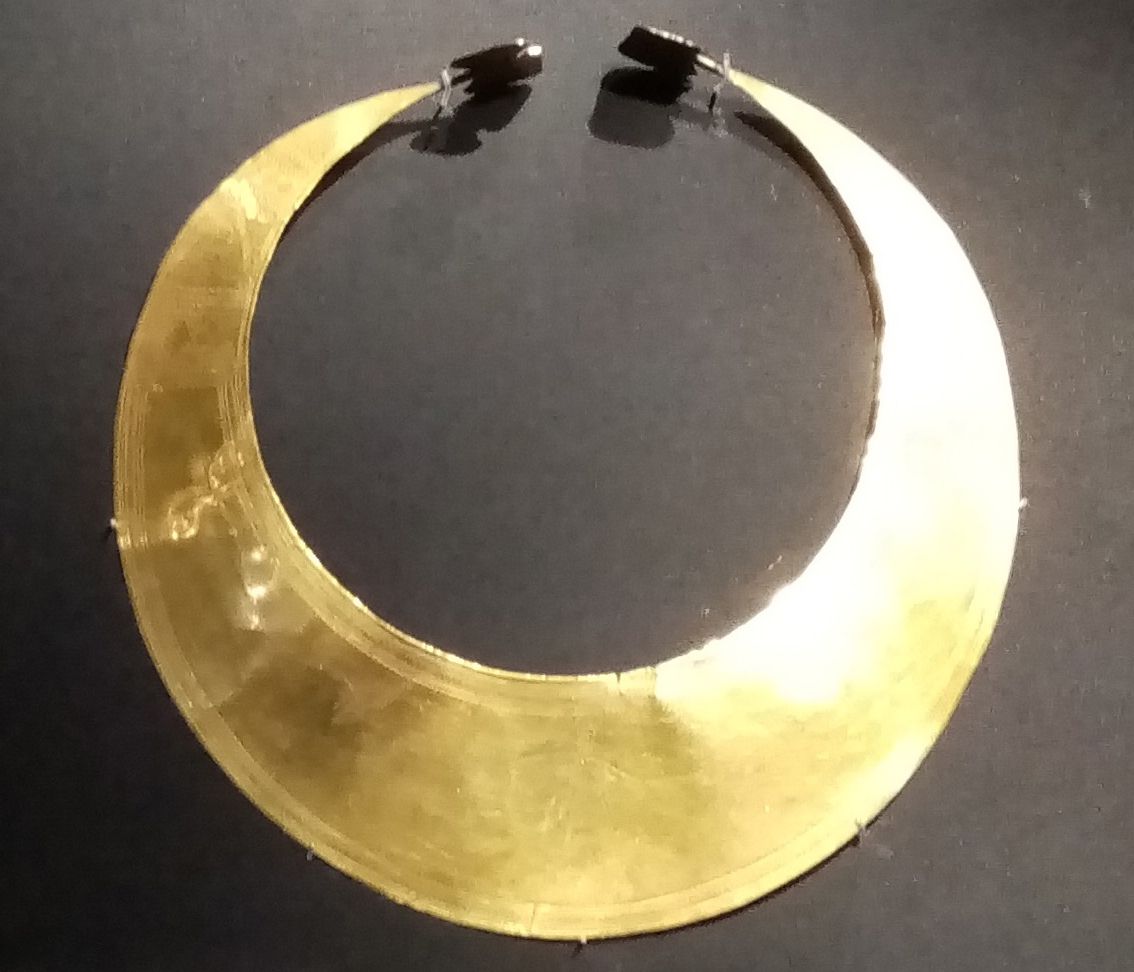
Gold lunula from St. Juliot, Cornwall

== See also ==
- Wessex culture
- Nebra Sky Disc
- Únětice culture
- Armorican Tumulus culture
- Bell Beaker culture
- Neolithic British Isles
- Golden hat
- Nordic Bronze Age
