= Clandon Barrow =

Bowl barrow in England

Coordinates: 50.6996°N 2.4880°W

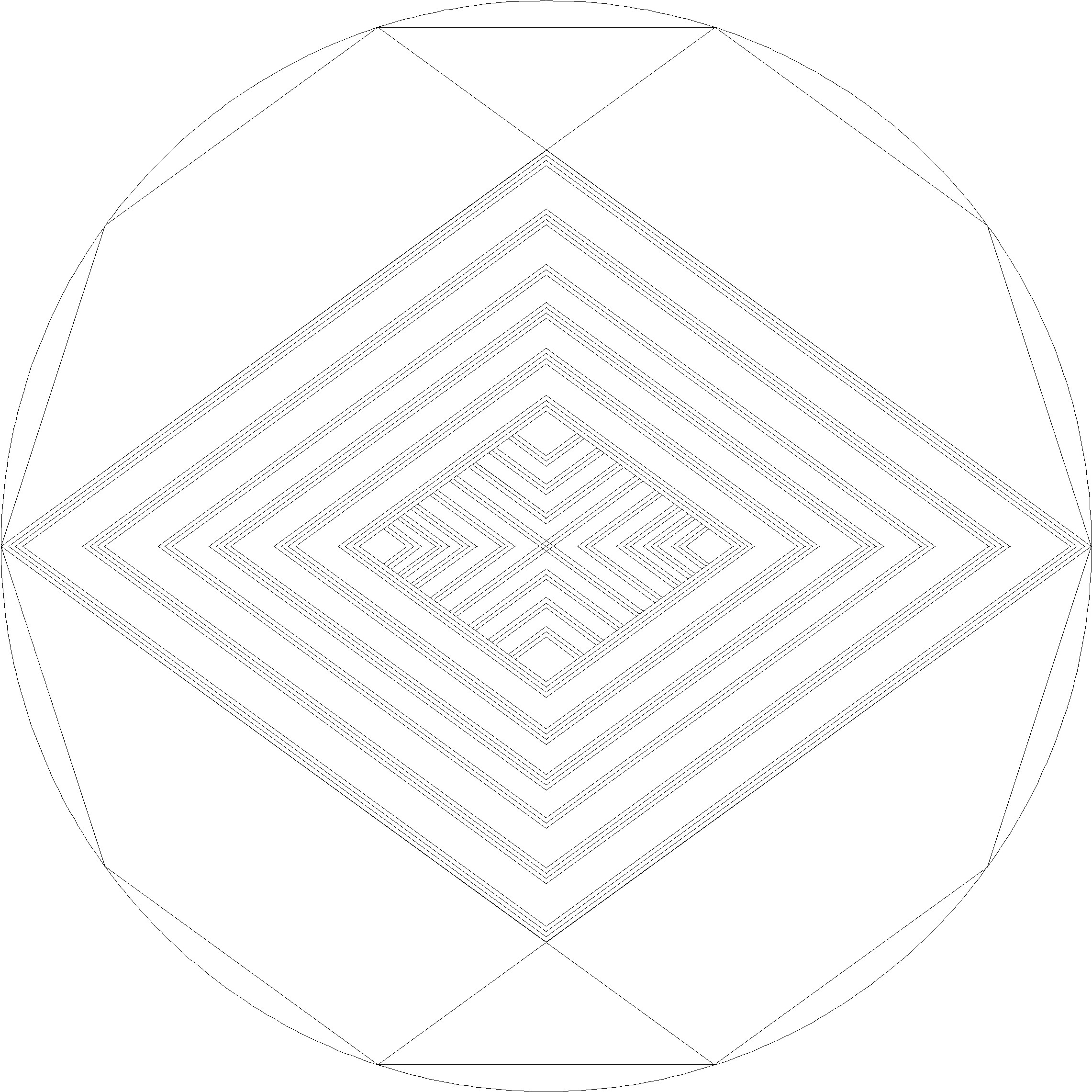
Diagram showing the geometric construction of the Clandon Barrow gold lozenge

Clandon Barrow is a very large bowl barrow dating from the Bronze Age, which overlooks the village of Martinstown, near Dorchester in Dorset, and which lies on the same ridge as Maiden Castle, near to the Mount Pleasant henge. It was excavated by Edward Cunnington in 1882. Gold objects were found including a cup and the Clandon Lozenge. The lozenge has recently been studied along with a similar artifact from Bush Barrow (near Stonehenge). It has now been clearly demonstrated that both the form and decorative elements of these lozenges were based on geometric designs. The Clandon example was created with decagon based geometry, the Bush Barrow example was based on a hexagon.

== Gallery ==
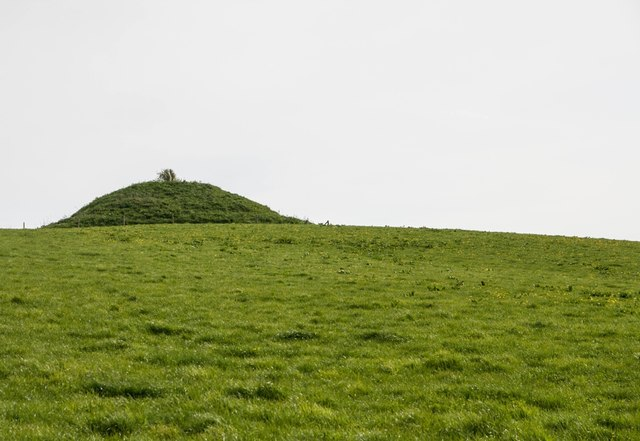
Clandon Barrow
