= Normanton Down Barrows =

Barrows in England

Normanton Down round barrow cemetery
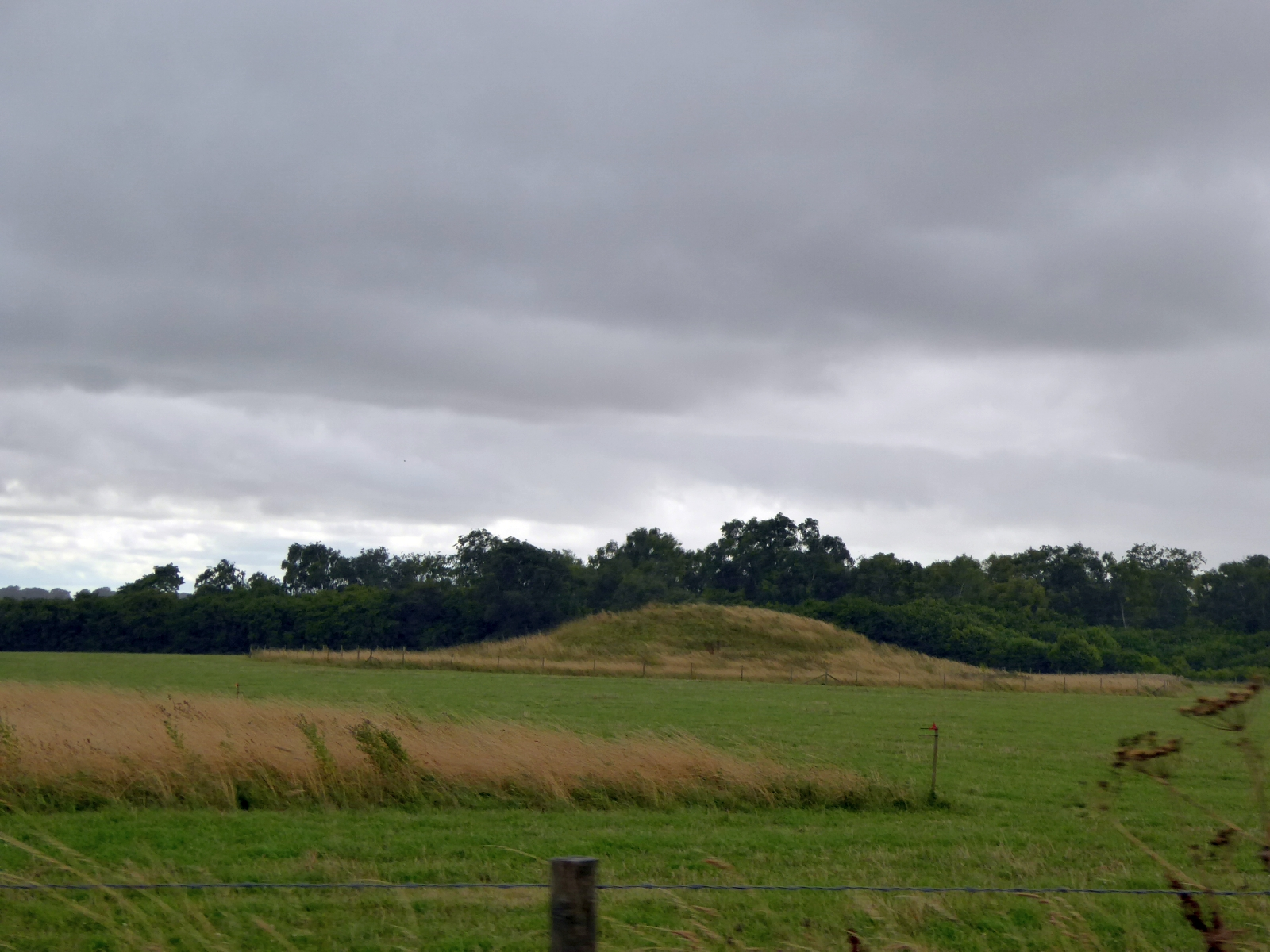
- Round barrow on Normanton Down

- Location within Wiltshire
- 51.170°N 1.830°W
- Type: Round barrow cemetery
- Periods: Bronze Age
- Location: grid reference SU120412
- Part of: Stonehenge ritual landscape

Site notes
- Length: 1 km (0.62 mi)
- Excavation dates: 18th and 19th centuries
- Archaeologists: William Cunnington and others
- Owner: Part managed as an RSPB reserve
- Public access: Crossed by two bridleways

UNESCO World Heritage Site
- Official name: Stonehenge, Avebury and Associated Sites
- Type: Cultural
- Criteria: i, ii, iii
- Designated: 1986 (10th session)
- Reference no.: 373
- Region: Europe and North America

Scheduled monument
- Designated: 1925
- Reference no.: (west to east): 1009617, 1009618, 1009614, 1009615, 1009616, 1010330

Normanton Down is a Neolithic and Bronze Age barrow cemetery, about 0.6 miles (1 km) south of Stonehenge in Wiltshire, England. The burials date from between 2600 and 1600 BC and consist of a Neolithic long barrow and some 40 or more Bronze Age round barrows, along the crest of a low ridge.

== Excavations ==
The barrows of Normanton Down, visible from Stonehenge along the southern horizon, have been part of the scenery of Salisbury Plain since 2000 BC. Barrow excavation was a popular hobby in the 18th and 19th centuries among amateur archaeologists, who became known as "barrow-diggers." In 1808, William Cunnington and Sir Richard Colt Hoare excavated several of the barrows, including the most important barrow, the Bush Barrow. Almost all of these barrows are believed to be from the Bronze Age, but several features, including a Long barrow, are earlier, dating to Neolithic times. Cunnington and Hoare noted four sets of "curiously huddled together" human remains in the east end of the Long barrow. Unlike many of the early excavations, Hoare published a detailed account of their findings in 1812. South of the long barrow lies a mortuary enclosure; this rectangular Neolithic earthwork, now ploughed out, was discovered by aerial photography and excavated in 1959.

Legal protection for many of the barrows was introduced in 1925 when they were designated a scheduled monument. The area was designated a World Heritage Site in 1987, since which excavation of any sort has been even more strictly controlled. Recent study has therefore focussed on re-appraising existing finds and non-intrusive fieldwork. In 2007, researchers from the University of Birmingham, funded by the Leverhulme Trust, began intensive studies of the artefacts found in all British Bronze Age burials, including those at Bush Barrow; and in 2010 an extensive survey of the condition and context of the barrows was made by English Heritage, as part of their Stonehenge World Heritage Site Landscape Project.

== Development of the site ==
The Normanton Down site reveals the development of an entire Bronze Age cemetery. 24 barrows are covered by 6 different Scheduled Monument designations, and a total of at least 35 surviving barrows were identified and numbered by L V Grinsell in 1957. They appeared gradually throughout the Bronze Age. Multiple graves all covered by a single barrow are characteristic of the area. The early part of the Bronze Age was marked by Beaker burials, characteristic of the Beaker people. The Beaker graves contained various funerary goods and were usually covered by round barrows; however, most of these barrows did not survive, making the graves hard to locate. It is assumed that these Beaker burials are mostly to the west, in areas marked by older long or oval barrows. Also, mounds were later erected over some of the pre-existing Beaker graves, enabling early excavators to locate them.

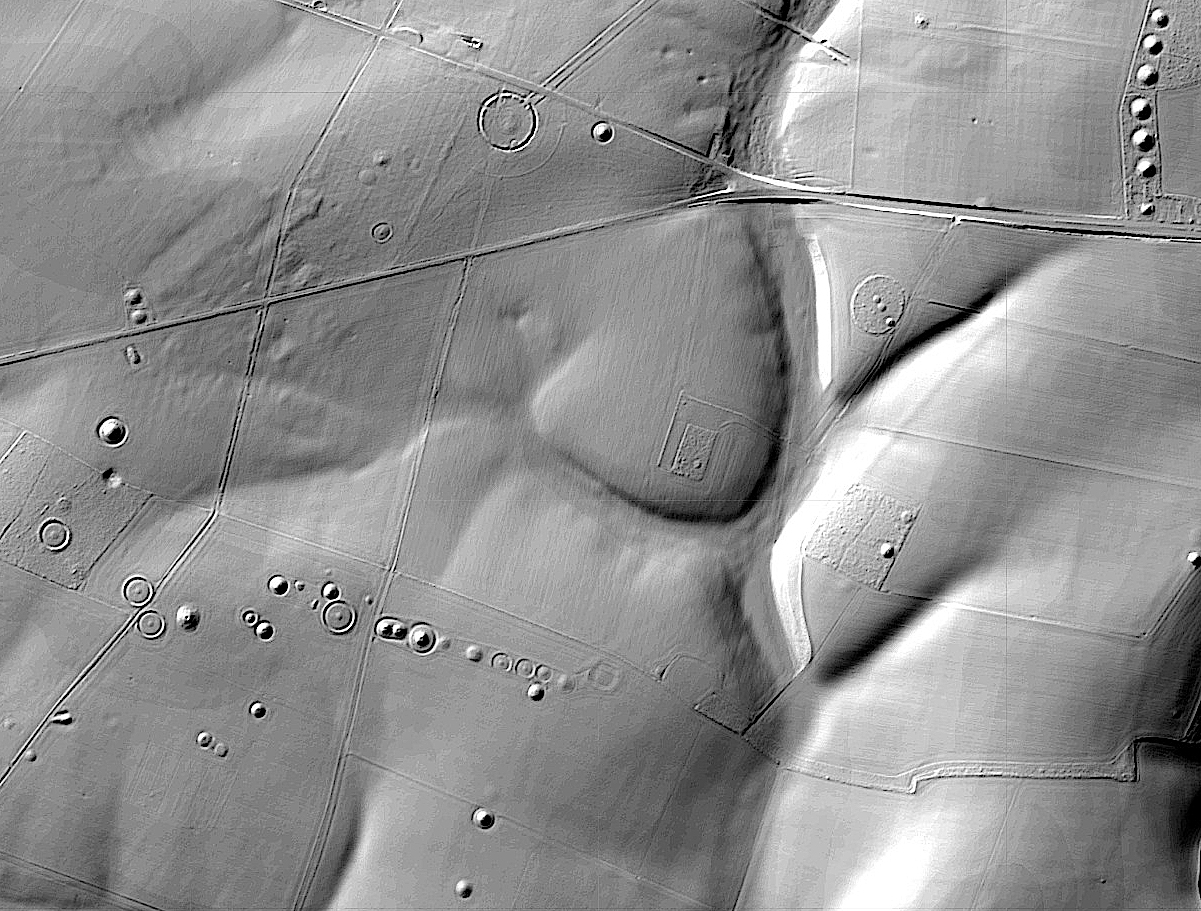
A lidar view of the landscape south of Stonehenge (top left of centre)

Later, the layout of the cemetery changed dramatically. The Normanton "linear" cemetery emerged along the main ridge, with three foci marking the landscape in a relatively straight line. Even though it is very likely that each focus was previously a Beaker grave, there is a clear tendency towards building sizeable mounds. Grave clustering seems to be present to some extent, especially in one of the Beaker burials and in the Bush Barrow.

Although most of the barrows were constructed by the end of the Early Bronze Age, a significant change appears in the middle of the Bronze Age. Burials involving Deverel-Rimbury urns of middle Bronze Age manufacture are present in clusters of small mounds. In the same time period, the burials appear to decline on Normanton Down, possibly shifting west to the vicinity of a remarkable feature known as the Wilsford shaft, which is a 30 metres (98 ft) deep shaft, within a mid-Bronze Age Pond barrow.

== Bush Barrow ==
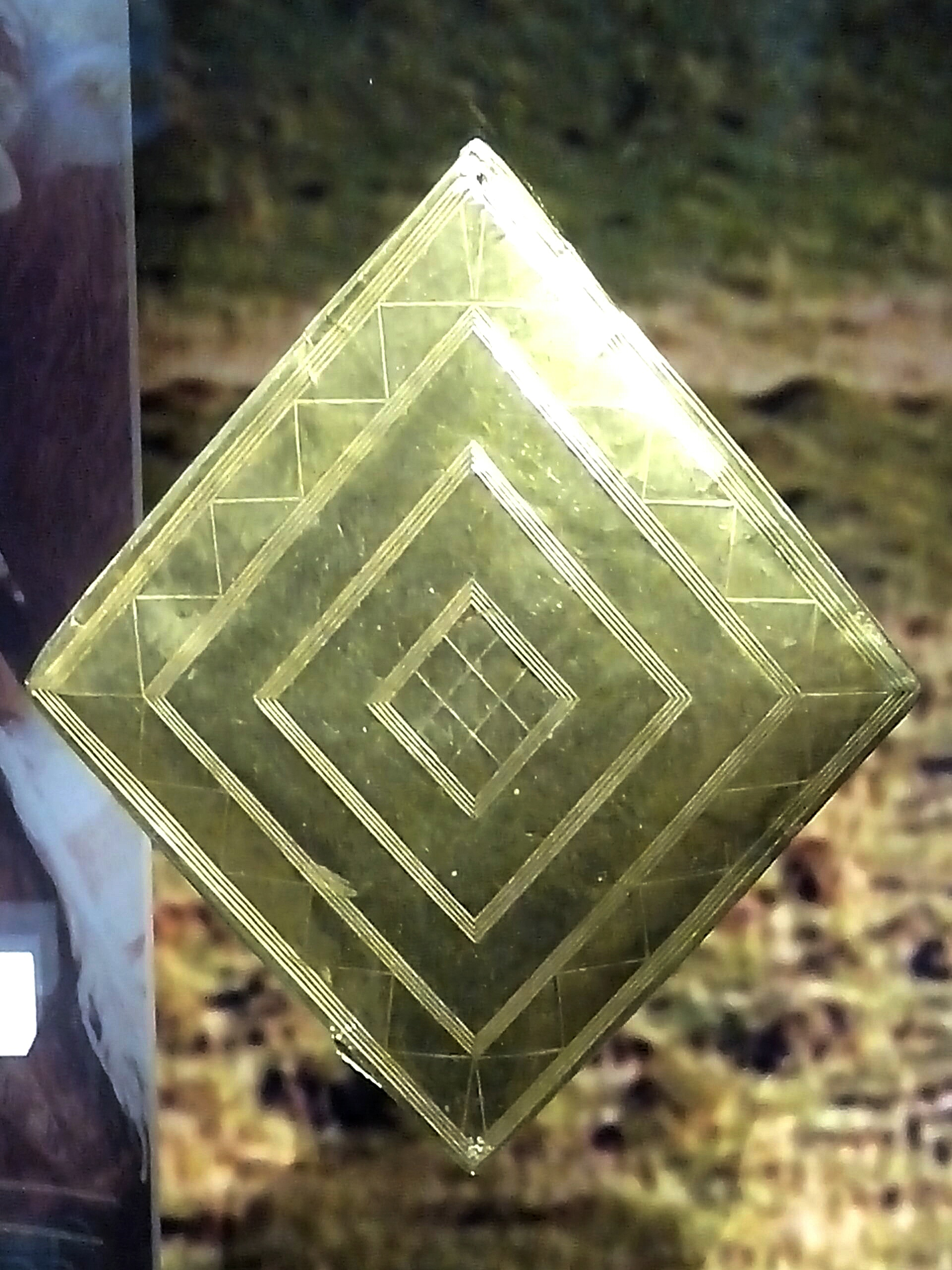
Gold lozenge from Bush Barrow

Boundary of the Stonehenge and Avebury World Heritage Site, with the location of Normanton Down Barrows

The most famous burial mound at Normanton Down is called Bush Barrow and is 40m wide and 3m high. The name "Bush Barrow" was given to this archaeological site in the 1720s by William Stukeley because of the trees planted on the top. It was previously known as "the green barrow" for the same reason. It was excavated in 1808 by William Cunnington and Sir Richard Colt-Hoare, who found multiple artefacts inside the mound. Cunnington wrote a detailed account of the discovery of a body and artefacts surrounding it in the barrow. He described that the head of the grave was at the south and the body was positioned on the floor rather than in a pit, which was considered unusual. In the account, Cunnington described pieces of brass and wood that are now believed to be the remains of a rare type of dagger or knife. Modern reconstructions have led to the conclusion that the artefacts were arranged closely around the body.

Below is an extract from Cunnington's account:

" On reaching the floor of the barrow, we discovered the skeleton of a stout and tall man lying from south to north: the extreme length of his thigh bone was 20 inches. About 18 inches south of the head we found several brass (i. e. bronze) rivets intermixed with wood and some thin bits of brass nearly decomposed. These articles covered a space of 12 inches or more; it is probable therefore that they were the mouldered remains of a shield. Near the right arm was a large dagger of brass and a spearhead of the same material, full 13 inches long, and the largest we have ever found. Immediately over the breast of the skeleton was a large plate of gold, in the form of a lozenge and measuring 7 inches by 6 inches. The even surface of this noble ornament is relieved by indented lines, checks and zigzags, forming the shape of the outline, and forming lozenge within lozenge, diminishing gradually towards the centre. We next discovered, on the right side of the skeleton, a very curious perforated stone, some wrought articles of bone, many small rings of the same material and another lozenge of gold. As this stone bears no marks of wear or attrition, I can hardly consider it to have been used as a domestic implement, and from the circumstances of it being composed of a mass of seaworms or little serpents, I think we may not be too fanciful in considering it an article of consequence."

The finds from Bush Barrow are now displayed at the Wiltshire Museum in Devizes, which preserves the manuscript notes made by Cunnington and the drawings made by Philip Crocker.

== Significance ==
The type and quantity of grave goods found at Normanton Down suggest it was a burial place for people of high social status. Lavish burial configurations have also been identified. For example, the senior males found buried with daggers were originally placed in the grave lying on their left side. These males were most likely community leaders who toted daggers in their daily lives. In addition, the location of Normanton Down as a whole suggests a special burial site. It was laid out with clear and commanding views of Stonehenge and other ridge tops in every direction (except the north-west), and it is crossed by the same solstitial axis that passes through Stonehenge. Further study of Normanton Down has revealed an absence of flint-working on the site relative to its immediately surrounding areas. It seems the location was set apart from everyday activities and most likely carried special significance. Compared to other similar cemeteries, the Normanton Down location contains an uncommonly high number of disc barrows in addition to several bell barrows and one saucer barrow.
