= Winterborne St Martin =

Coordinates: 50.6992°N 2.5009°W

Winterborne St Martin (Martinstown)
- Village and civil parish
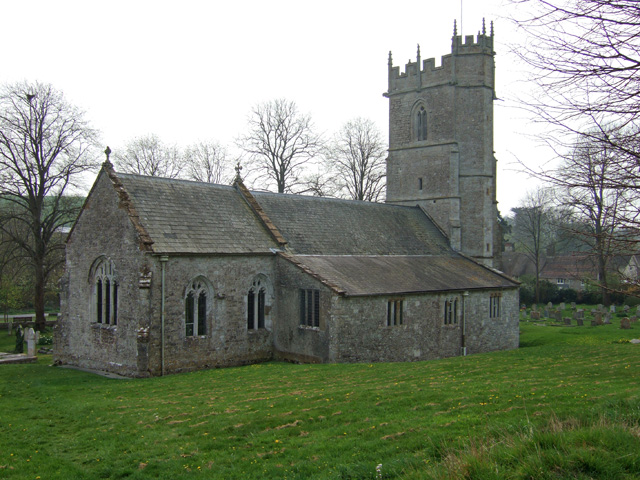
- Parish church of St Martin

- Location within Dorset
- Population: 780
- OS grid reference: SY650890
- Civil parish: Winterborne St Martin
- Unitary authority: Dorset
- Ceremonial county: Dorset
- Region: South West
- Country: England
- Sovereign state: United Kingdom
- Post town: Dorchester
- Postcode district: DT2
- Dialling code: 01305
- Police: Dorset
- Fire: Dorset and Wiltshire
- Ambulance: South Western
- UK Parliament: West Dorset
- Website: Village website

Winterborne St Martin, commonly known as Martinstown, is a village and civil parish in southwest Dorset, England, situated 4 miles (6.4 km) southwest of Dorchester, beside Maiden Castle. In 2013 the estimated population of the civil parish was 780.

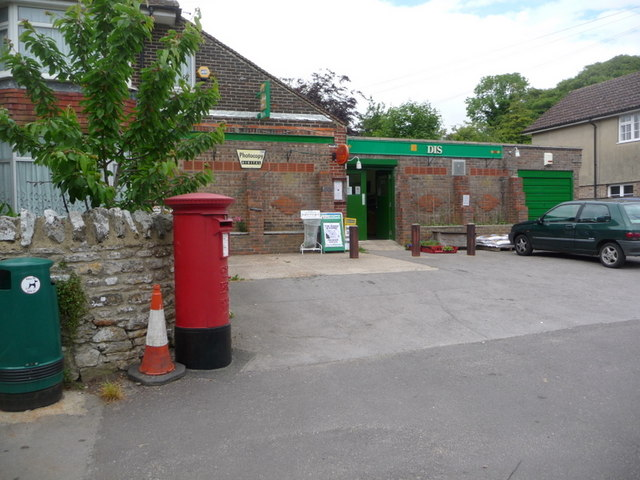
Winterborne St. Martin, post office and postbox

In the centre of the village is the parish church of St Martin, which dates from the 12th century and has a Norman font. Other amenities in the village include a public house, village hall and post office. Bronze Age barrows including Clandon Barrow surround the village, and Maiden Castle hillfort is nearby. The stream running through the village is a winterbourne though rarely dries out in the summer now.

Winterborne St Martin is in the UK Weather Records for the Highest 24-hour total (Note: This total was reported for the Meteorological Day (0900–0900 GMT). Other 24 hour periods have exceeded this value (November 2009 and December 2015), but not during the meteorological day.) rainfall, which was recorded in the village on 18 July 1955. The total recorded was 279 mm (11 inches) in a 15-hour period.

== History ==
In 1086 in the Domesday Book Winterborne St Martin was recorded as Wintreburne; it had 22 households, 6 ploughlands, 13 acres (5.3 ha) of meadow and one mill. It was in the hundred of Dorchester and the lord and tenant-in-chief was Hawise, wife of Hugh son of Grip.

In 1268 Henry II granted a charter to Winterborne St Martin, which allowed the village to hold an annual fair within five days of St. Martin's Day. The fair, which in times past was a leading horse market and amusement fair, had been revived, but the old-time custom of roasting a ram was replaced once during an event in the 1960s with a 'badger roast'. The 80 lb badger was caught in a snare, and many villagers thought they were eating goose.

After a hundred years silence, bells in the church rang out in 1947. Five new bells were hung as a village memorial to those who died in the war. An earlier peal had been sold to defray debts.

In 2007 and 2014 Martinstown won the Best Kept Village in Dorset Award, in the Large Village Category.

The Catholic martyr John Adams was born in Winterborne St Martin in about 1543. The politician Sir Francis Ashley was the main landowner here in the early seventeenth century.

== Governance ==
After 2019 structural changes to local government in England, Winterborne St Martin is part of the Winterborne and Broadmayne ward which elects 1 member to Dorset Council.

Winterborne St Martin was within an electoral ward that bears its name and extends from Winterbourne Abbas in a roughly south-easterly direction to the edge of Upwey. The total population of this ward was 2,095 in the 2011 census. The ward was one of 32 that comprised the West Dorset parliamentary constituency.

== See also ==
- List of hundreds in Dorset
