= Wessex culture =

Bronze Age culture in Britain

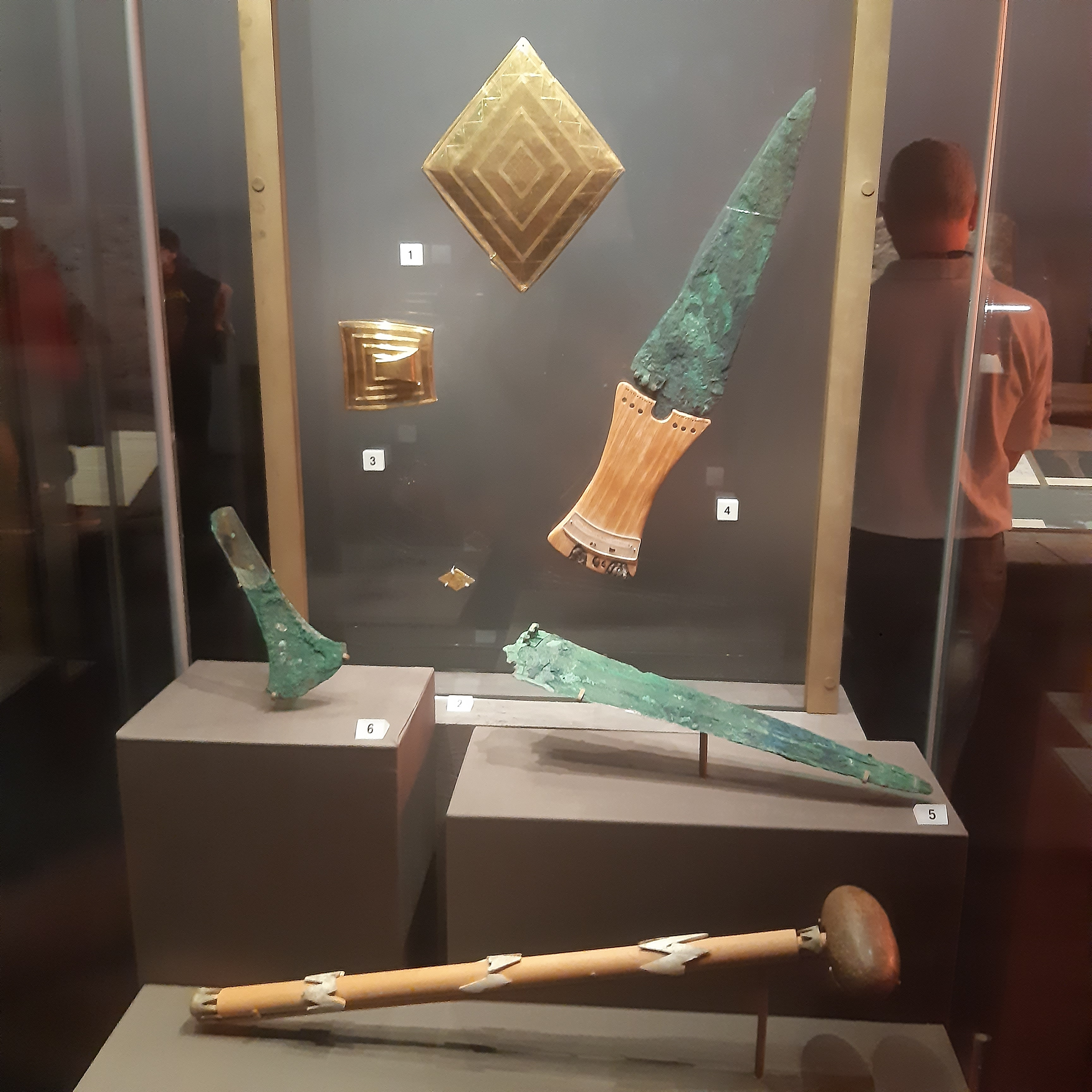
Finds from the Bush Barrow near Stonehenge, c. 1900 BC

The Wessex culture is the predominant prehistoric culture of central and southern Britain during the early Bronze Age, originally defined by the British archaeologist Stuart Piggott in 1938.

The culture is related to the Hilversum culture of the southern Netherlands, Belgium and northern France, and linked to the Armorican Tumulus culture in northern France and the Únětice culture in central Germany, with connections to the Argaric culture in southern Iberia and to Mycenaean Greece. It is prototyped with the Middle Rhine group of the Bell Beaker culture and commonly subdivided in the consecutive phases of Wessex I (2000–1650 BC) and Wessex II (1650–1400). Piggott attributes the origin of this culture to an "actual ethnic movement" from Northern France. Piggott describes the culture as composed of an underlying substratum, similar to the contemporary food vessel culture found further north, and an intrusive ruling class who opened trading networks with France and central and northern Europe, and imported bronze tools and probably also artisans.

It has been speculated that river transport allowed Wessex to be the main link to the Severn estuary. The wealth from such trade probably permitted the Wessex people to construct the second and third (megalithic) phases of Stonehenge and also indicates a powerful form of social organisation.

== History ==
The Wessex culture is typically split up into two periods - the first in 2000-1650 BC and the second in 1650-1400 BC.

=== Wessex I (2000-1650 BC) ===
The culture is related to the Hilversum culture, and consisted of Bell Beaker people from what is today the Netherlands, Belgium and Northern France. The people of the first Wessex culture, commonly known as Wessex I, were involved with a rebuilding of Stonehenge, and made weapons such as daggers and axes with bronze.

=== Wessex II (1650-1400 BC) ===
The Wessex II culture likely traded with Mycenaean Greece, as well as Crete and Egypt. They also had access to gold tools, found at their burial sites.

== Classification ==
When the term 'Wessex Culture' was first coined, investigations into British prehistory were in their infancy and the unusually rich and well documented burials in the Wessex area loomed large in literature on the Bronze Age. During the twentieth century many more Bronze Age burials were uncovered and opinions about the nature of the early-mid Bronze Age shifted considerably. Since the late 20th century it has become customary to consider 'Wessex Culture' as a limited social stratum rather than a distinct cultural grouping, specifically referring to the hundred or so particularly richly furnished graves in and around Wiltshire. The culture group, however, is named as one of the intrusive Beaker groups that appear in Ireland.

== Artefacts ==
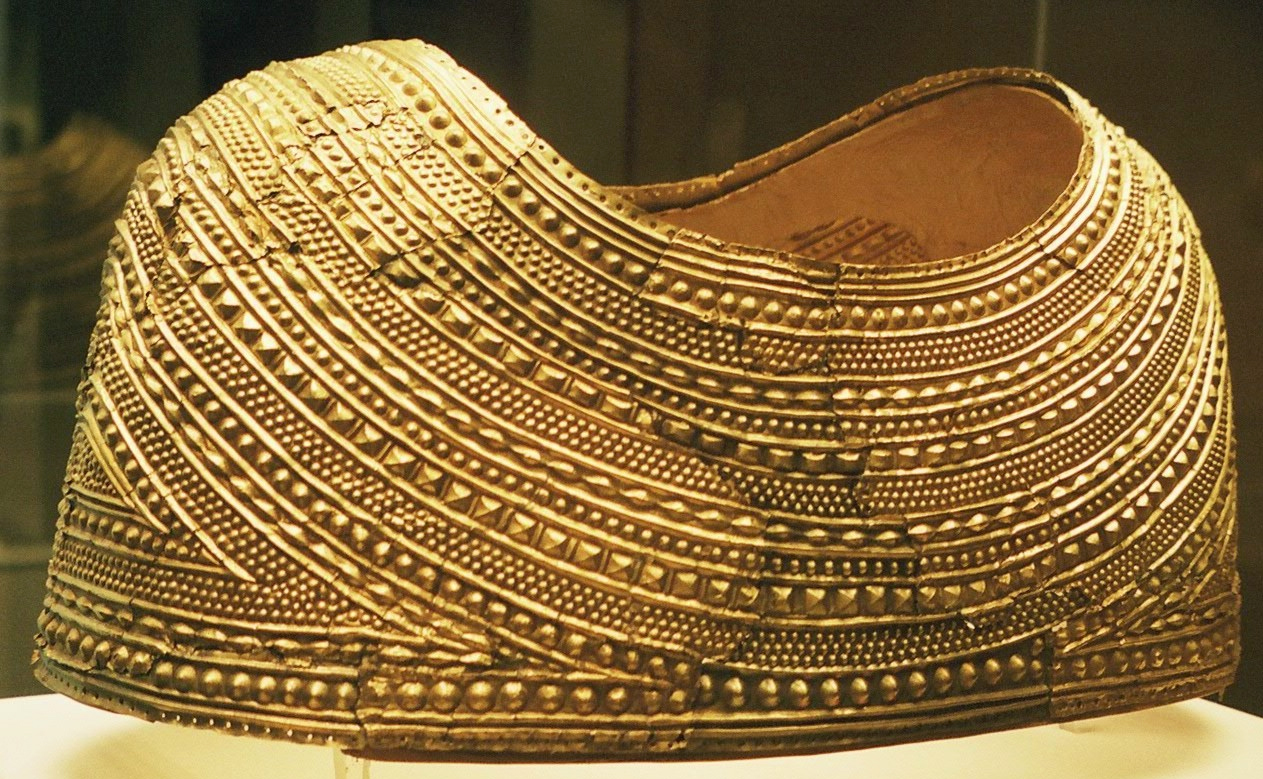
The Mold gold cape. Bronze Age, about 1900–1600 BC. From Mold, Flintshire, North Wales

The first phase, Wessex I, is characterised by rich depositions in the graves of chieftains, including gold artifacts, and crouched inhumations under barrows (e.g. the Bush Barrow). This period is closely associated with the construction and use of the later phases of Stonehenge. The second phase, Wessex II, is characterised by less rich grave goods without gold and a resurgence of cremations, believed to be a return to the previous funerary practices of the British Neolithic. They appear to have had wide ranging trade links with continental Europe, importing amber from the Baltic, jewellery from modern day Germany, gold from Brittany as well as daggers and beads from Mycenaean Greece and vice versa. They produced characteristic pendants in the shape of halberds, with handles made from gold or amber, or a combination of these materials.

== See also ==
- Bush Barrow
- Bronze Age Europe
- Únětice culture
- Argaric culture
- Nordic Bronze Age
- Ottomány culture
- Polada culture
- Wietenberg culture
- Sintashta culture
- Nuragic culture
- Helladic culture
- Mycenaean Greece
- Minoan civilization

== Sources ==
- Piggott, S 1938. The Early Bronze Age in Wessex, Proc. Prehist. Soc. 4, 52–106.
- Piggott, S 1973. The Wessex culture of the Early Bronze Age, Victoria County History Wiltshire I (ii), 352-75.
- Coles, John; Taylor, Joan (March 1971). "The Wessex culture: a minimal view". Antiquity. 45 (177): 6–14. doi:10.1017/S0003598X00068988. ISSN 0003-598X. S2CID 163455375.
