= Armorican Tumulus culture =

Bronze Age archaeological culture in Western Europe

- Geographical range: Brittany, France
- Period: Bronze Age
- Dates: c. 2200 – c. 1400 BC
- Preceded by: Bell Beaker culture, Chalcolithic France
- Followed by: Atlantic Bronze Age

The Armorican Tumulus culture is a Bronze Age culture, located in the western part of the Armorican peninsula of France. It is known through more than a thousand burial sites covered by a tumulus or otherwise. The culture is renowned for some exceptionally richly endowed burials of chieftains of the time, which are contemporary with the elite of the Wessex culture, in England, and the Únětice culture, in Central Europe.

The extensive documentation of this funerary archaeology has been supplemented by the discovery of various types of habitat (dry stone houses, open air habitats, monumental enclosures, etc.)

== Overview ==
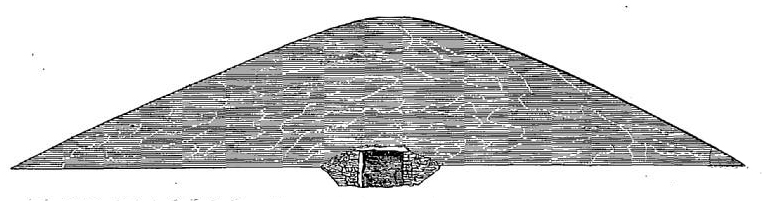
Section of the Kerhué Bras tumulus in Plonéour-Lanvern (Finistère)

The Armorican Tumuli refer to individual burials of the Bronze Age that can be covered by a tumulus in the western part of the Armorican peninsula of France, in a region commonly called Lower Brittany. Not all the tumuli of Brittany belong to the Armorican Tumulus culture. Older tumuli in the area date from the Neolithic period (e.g. the Saint-Michel tumulus) and later tumuli can also be found, dating to the Early Middle Ages (e.g. the Viking burial of Groix). Nevertheless, there are more than a thousand Bronze Age tumuli in the region, many of them exceptionally richly endowed burials of chieftains of the time.

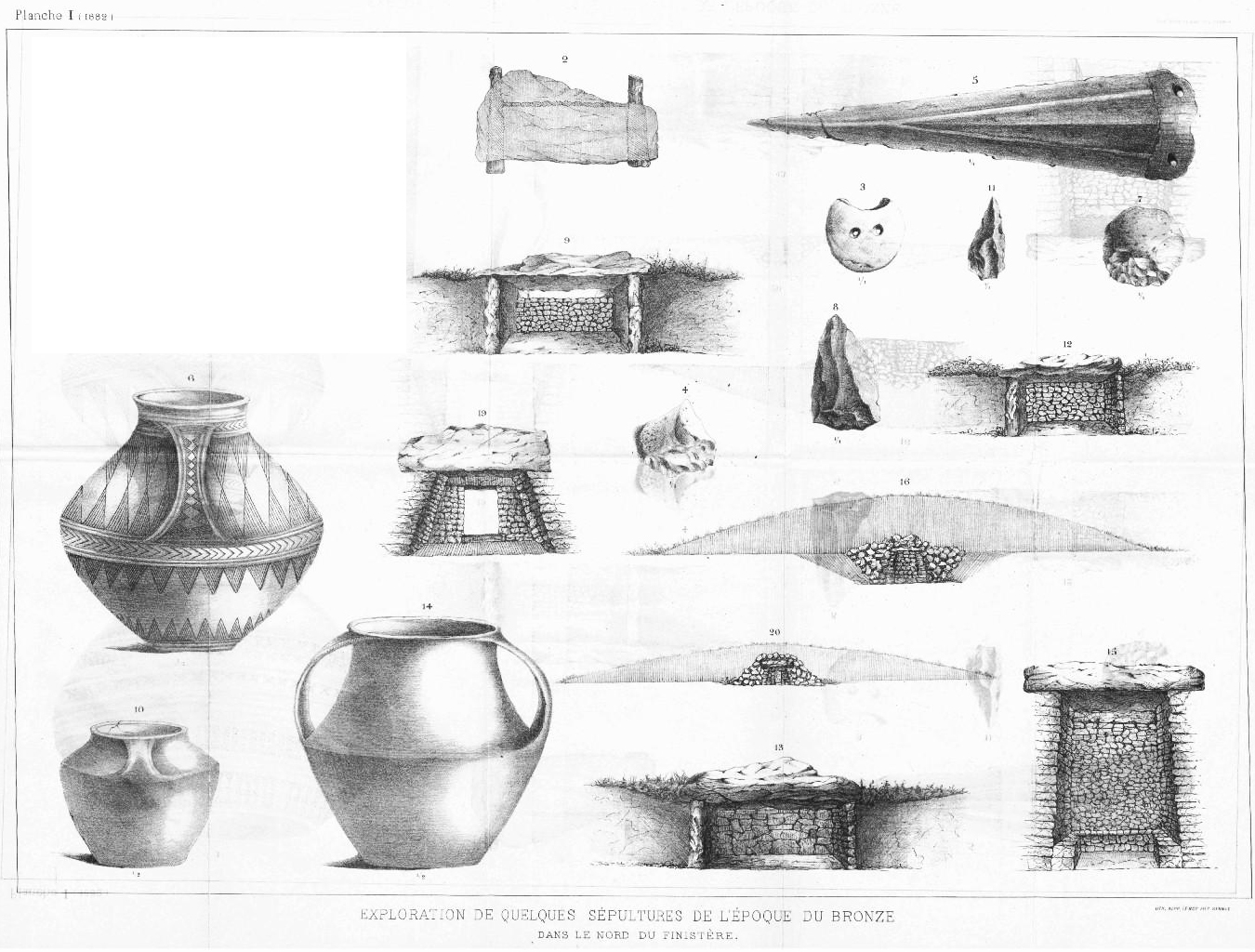
Bronze Age burials in Brittany

In the 1950s, Pierre-Roland Giot and Jean Cogné proposed a chronological division between arrowhead tombs (First series) and vase tombs (Second series), the First series dating from the Early Bronze Age and the Second series dating from the Middle Bronze Age. This thesis lacked a serious basis in typo-chronology, and has gradually been contradicted: the same types of dagger are found in both series and radiocarbon dating attests that they are contemporaneous. The Armorican Tumulus culture dates essentially from the Early Bronze Age (around 2150-1600 BCE) and without doubt from the Middle Bronze Age (around 1600-1350 BCE).

The Armorican Tumulus culture is characterised by a hierarchical society, with classic groups of burial mounds similar to the Wessex culture in Britain or Hilversum culture in Belgium. Settlements feature large houses, status symbols include daggers, halberds, and axes.

== Funeral practices ==
With the end of the Neolithic period, the use of collective megalithic burials (or dolmens) was abandoned in Brittany. During the Bell Beaker period, the development of individual burials may be observed, and this became widespread during the Early Bronze Age. The funerary architectures are varied, from the simple grave in a pit to the monumental tumulus measuring several tens of meters in diameter and several meters high (for example the tumuli of Kernonen and Saint-Fiacre). The grave can be made up of a cist made of edge slabs, dry stone walls or mixed walls (combining edge slabs and dry stones) or a wooden coffin. It can be covered by a cairn or a mound. Complete excavations of tumuli have shown that these monuments often have a complex history. Burials may have been added in the course of time, sometimes accompanied by an enlargement of the tumulus.

Despite the acidity of the soil in Brittany, more than a hundred skeletons, more or less well preserved, have been discovered in the Armorican tumuli. These burials are generally individual, but there are a few attested cases of double or triple even tombs. The bodies are most often found on their sides in a flexed position with the head to the east. They correspond to the remains of adults and children. The existence of young children buried in monumental tombs indicates the hereditary character of social status.

== Material Culture ==
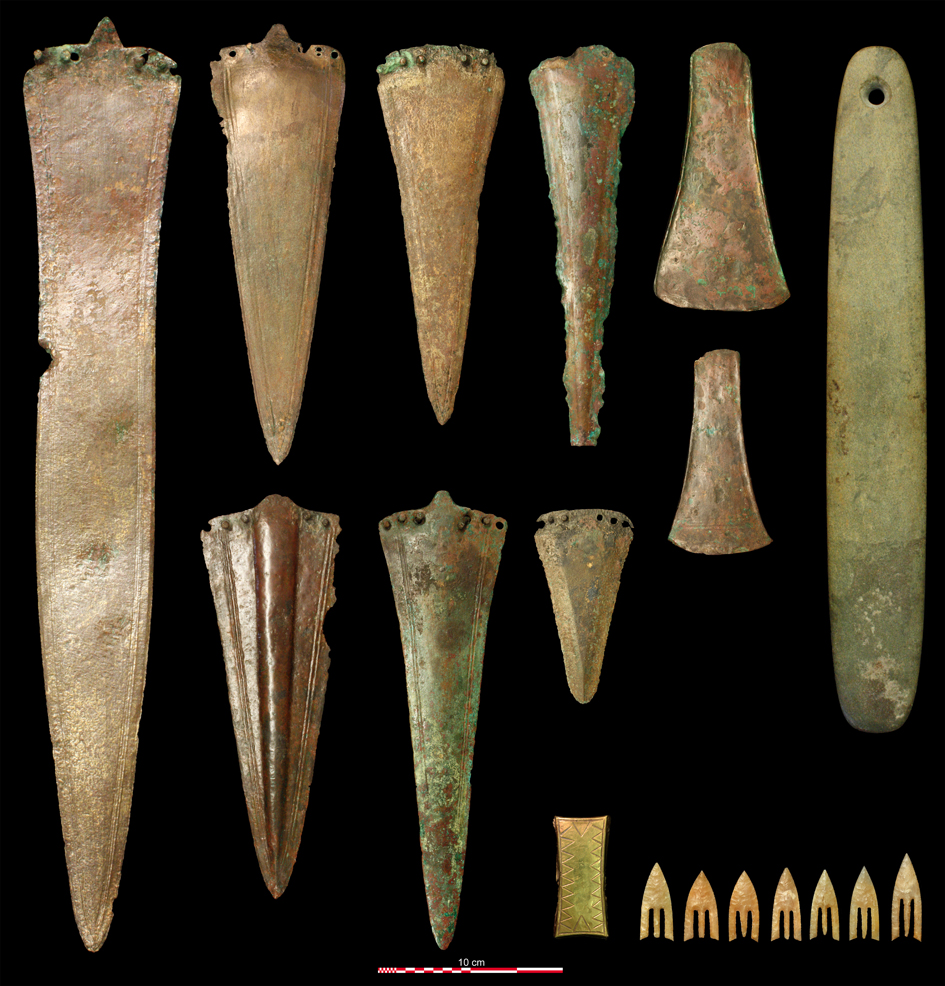
Daggers and axes made of copper alloy, gold archer's wristguard, sharpener made of schist and Armorican arrowheads made of flint from the Early Bronze Age tumulus of La Motta (Lannion, Côtes-d'Armor).

A strong social hierarchy is demonstrated through the funerary deposits: fine arrowheads, bronze weapons, gold artefacts, and exotic ornaments are largely reserved for the elite; bronze daggers and ceramics seem to distinguish a class of notables (heads of lineages or clans), while the majority did not deliver any grave goods that have been preserved.

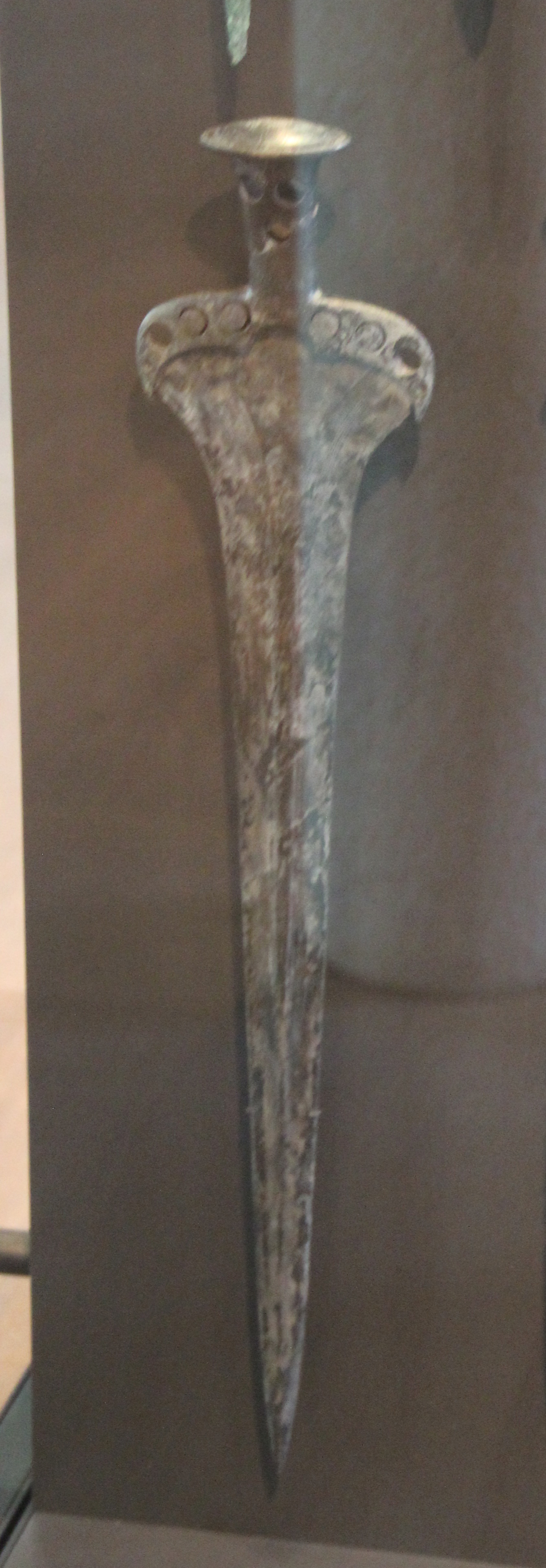
Bronze sword, c. 1600 BC.

The Armorican Tumulus culture are famous for their tombs of chiefs, richly endowed with prestigious goods deposited in wooden boxes. They deliver dozens of so-called Armorican arrowheads finely cut in blond flint from the Lower Turonian deposits of the Cher valley. They are undoubtedly the work of flint craftsmen and the symbol of the power of the chiefs of the time. Along with his arrows are bronze daggers and axes, the former being kept in leather scabbards and sometimes decorated with small gold studs (1 to 3 mm). One grave can accumulate up to ten daggers – beyond any measure in the rest of Western Europe in the Early Bronze Age. The daggers are of the Armorican type and generally decorated with meshes parallel to the edges and pierced with six rivet holes. More exceptionally, silver goblets, gold or silver chains, pendants and archer's armbands in amber, Whitby jet or gold and large stone sharpeners may be found in these graves.

Ceramics are never discovered in these chieftains' tombs. It is generally of biconical shape often associated with handles in variable number (1 to 6). It can be decorated with chevrons, hatched triangles and grooves.

In a few graves, located along the coast, ringed or biconical earthenware beads of British origin can be found. These pearls as well as the exotic ornaments bear witness to extensive exchange networks in Western Europe. The links were close with the elites of Wessex, whose graves yielded daggers of possible Breton origin (see for example the Bush Barrow).

== Domestic life ==
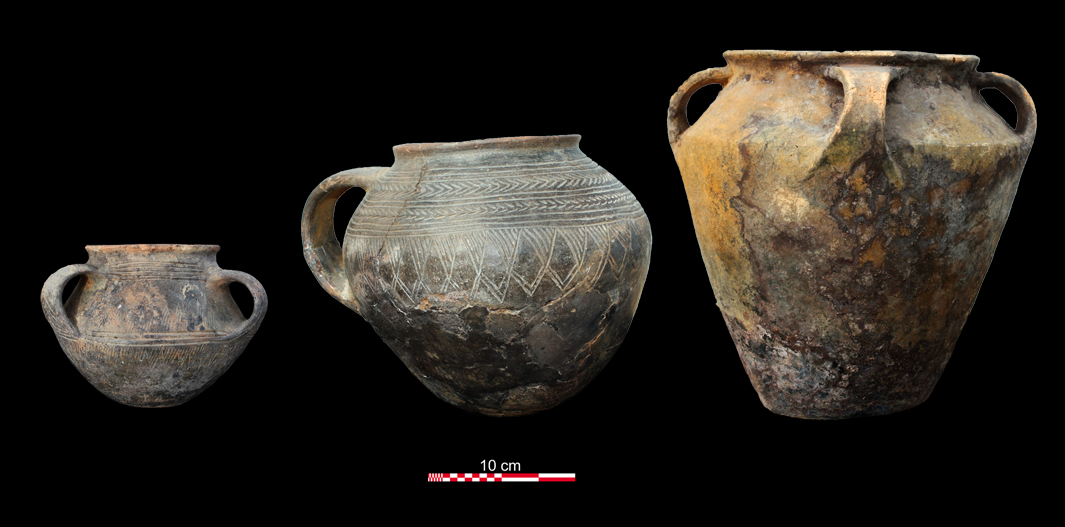
Armorican vases with handles, Early Bronze Age

Several recent excavations have led to the discovery of settlements from the Early Bronze Age. On the island of Molène (Finistère), the house of Beg ar Loued shows the evolution of a dry stone construction between the end of the Bell Beaker culture and the Early Bronze Age. The people grew cereals (bare and dressed barley, emmer and wheat) and legumes (beans and peas), raised beef, pork, sheep (and perhaps goat) and practiced coastal fishing (collection of limpets on the foreshore and probably making use of fishing dams) but also hunting (grey seal, seabirds) . The practice of metallurgy is also attested in the form of a granite mold and copper beads. In Lannion (Côtes-d'Armor), two successive excavations by the National Institute for Preventive Archaeological Research (INRAP) led to the discovery of a monumental enclosure associated with two burial mounds from the Early Bronze Age and a network of plots into which a habitat was inserted during the Bronze Age 12. (Note: A Bronze Age site and a Gallo-Roman farm discovered in the Penn an Alé business park, in Lannion, Inrap, 2013)

The development of agricultural practices coupled with ore resources (notably the tin essential for the production of bronze) probably explains the boom in the culture of the Armorican Tumulus culture.

== Gallery ==
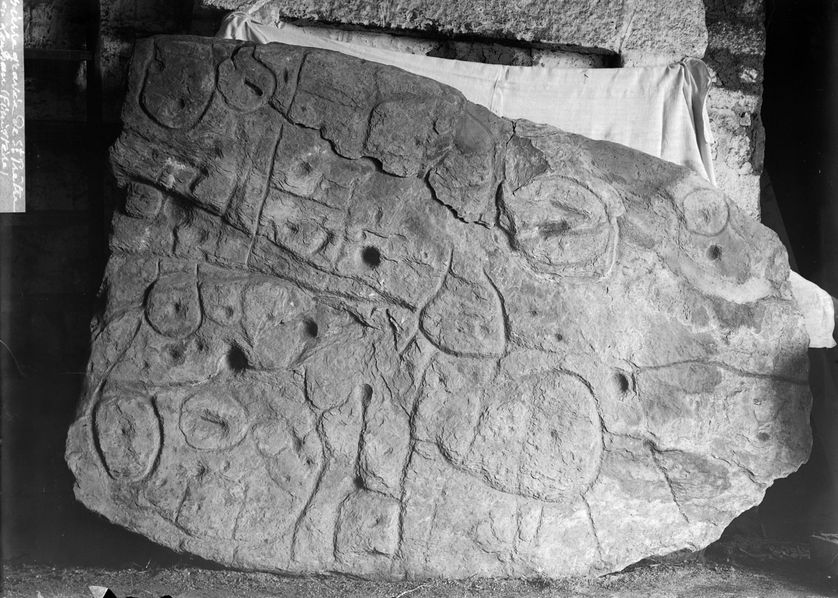
Saint-Bélec slab, an Early Bronze Age map, c. 2000 BC.

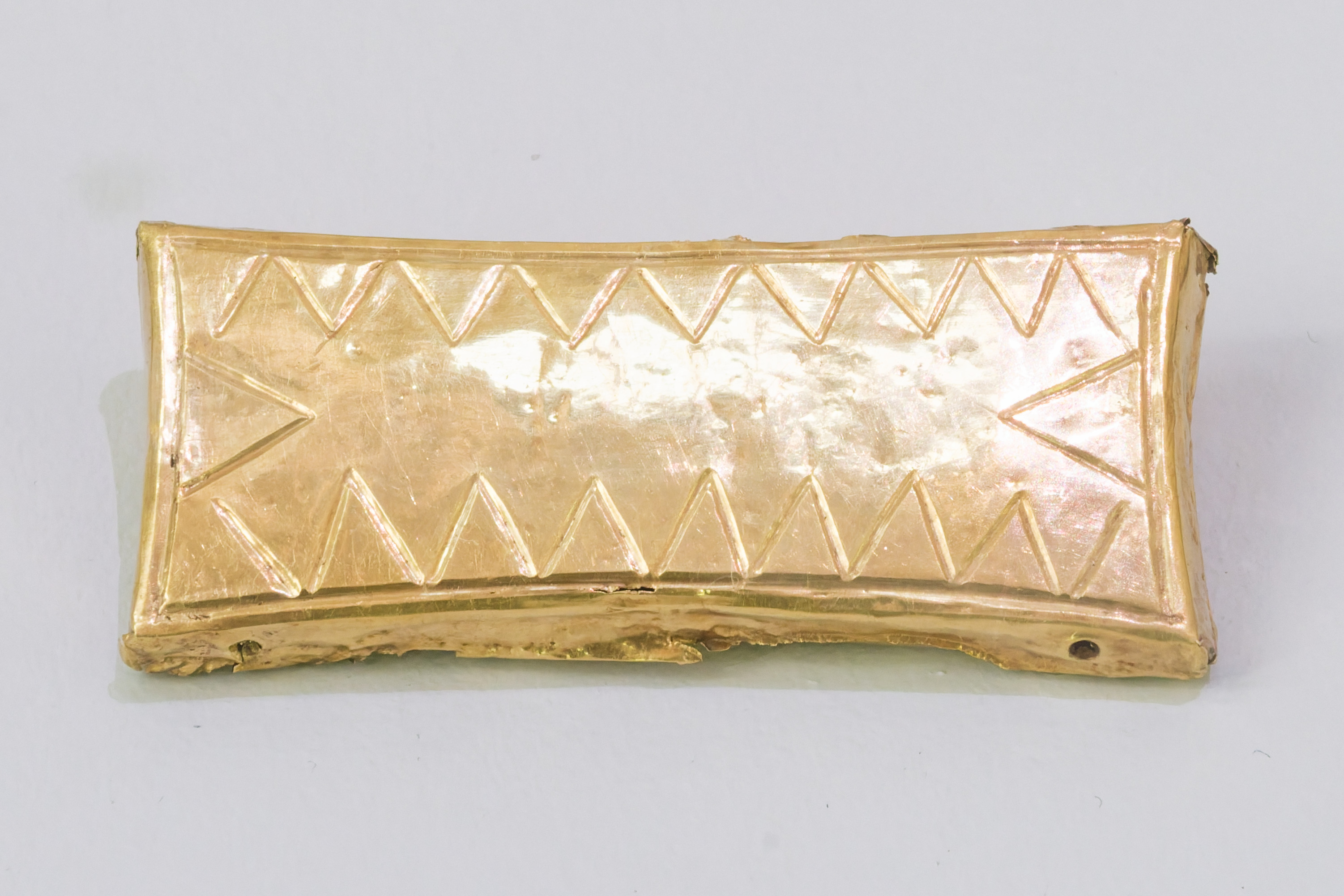
Gold wristguard

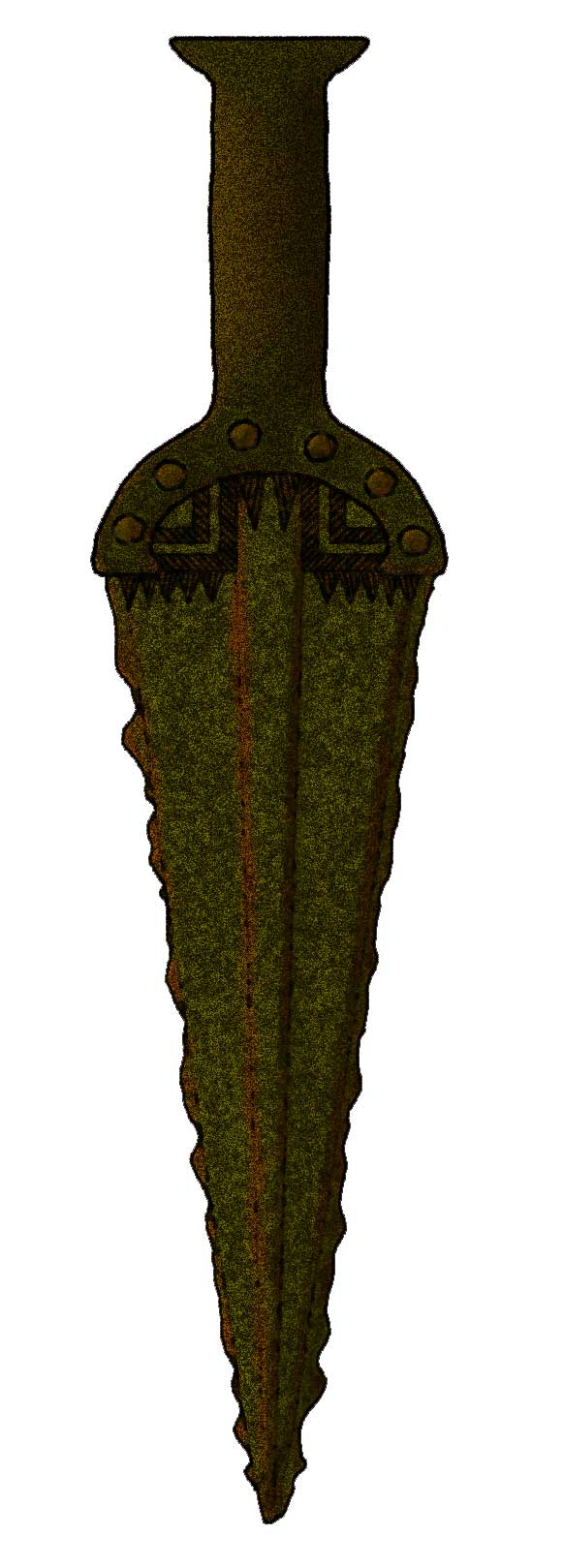
Early Bronze Age dagger, illustration

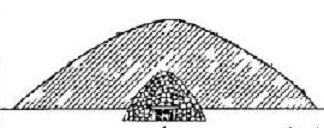
Tumulus of Kerhor

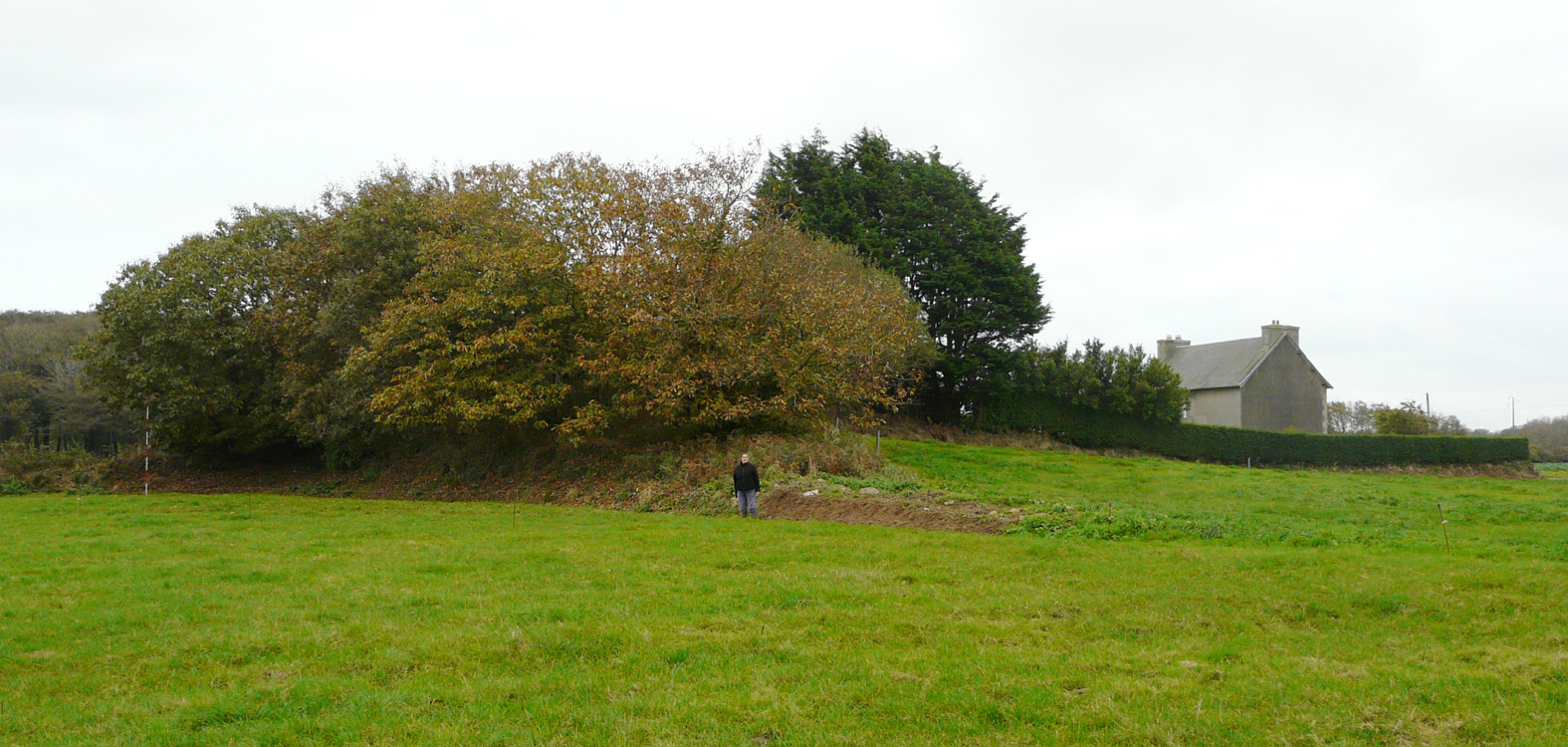
Site of the Tumulus of Kernonen

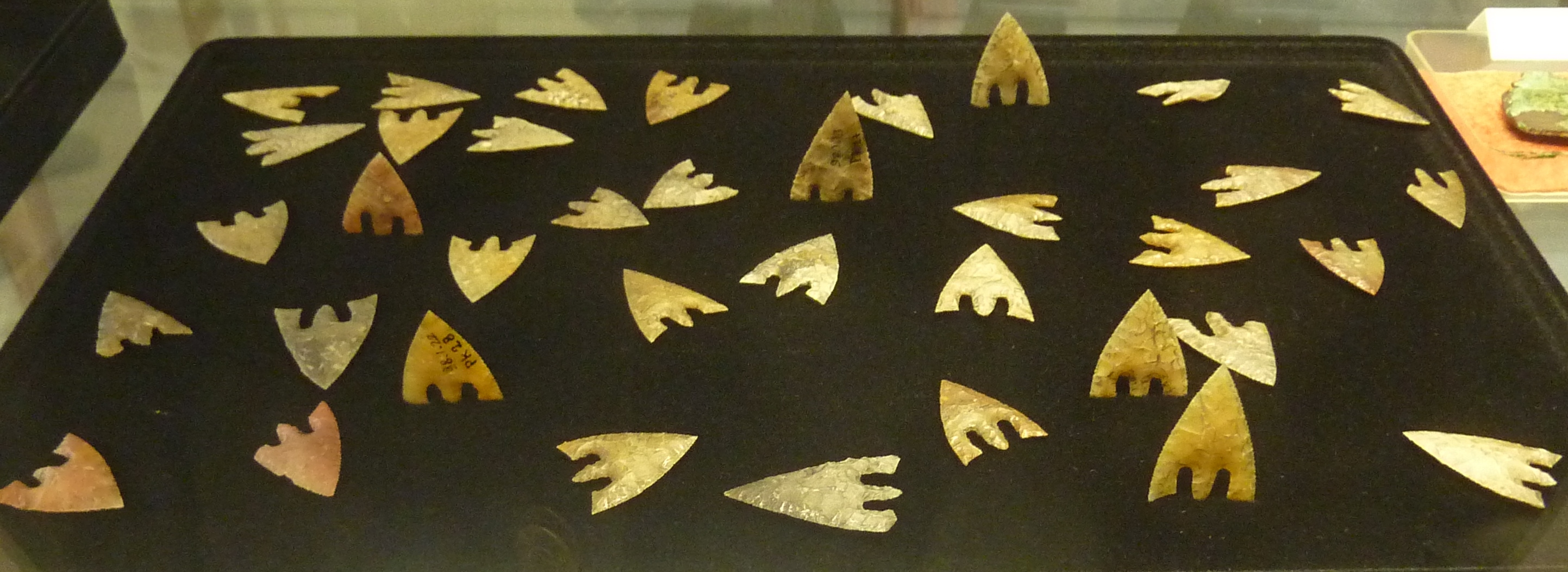
Yellow flint arrowheads, c. 2100 BC

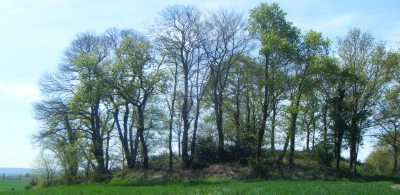
Tumulus of Saint Fiacre, 2000-1800 BC

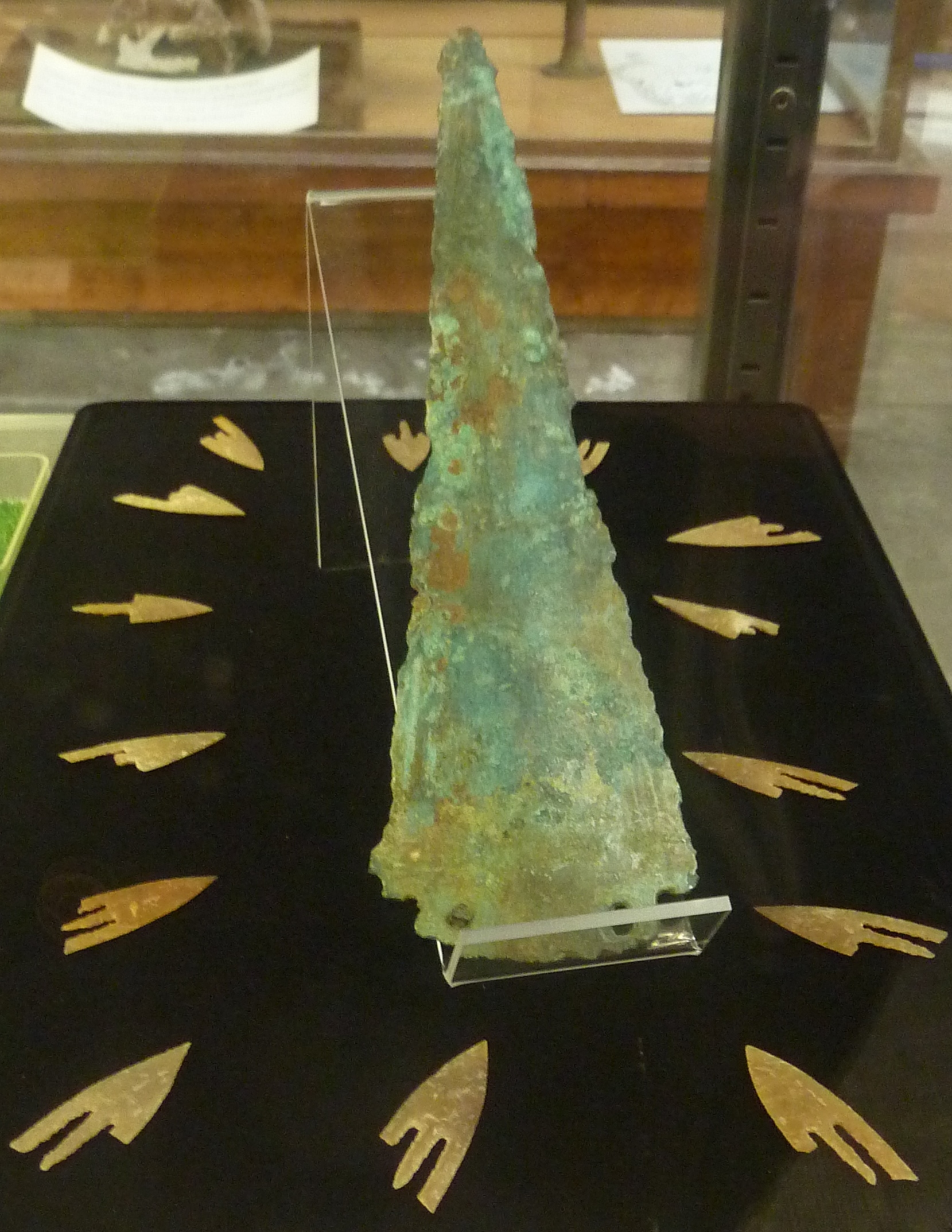
Dagger and arrowheads from Coatanéa en Bourg-Banc

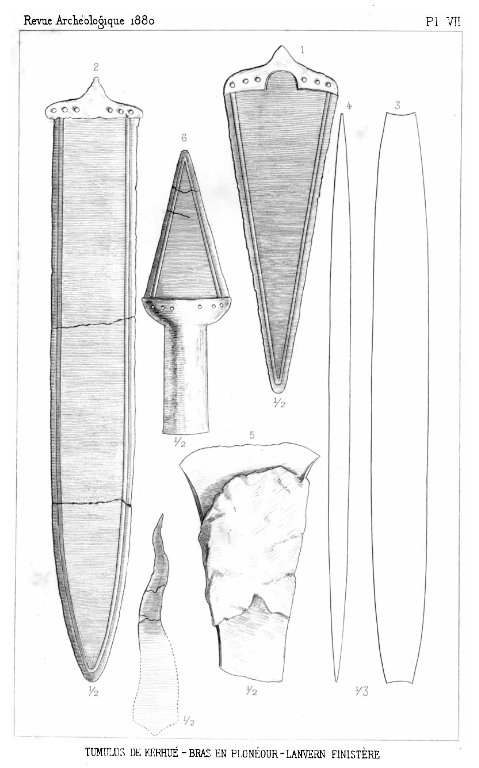
Artefacts from the Tumulus de Kerhue-Bras

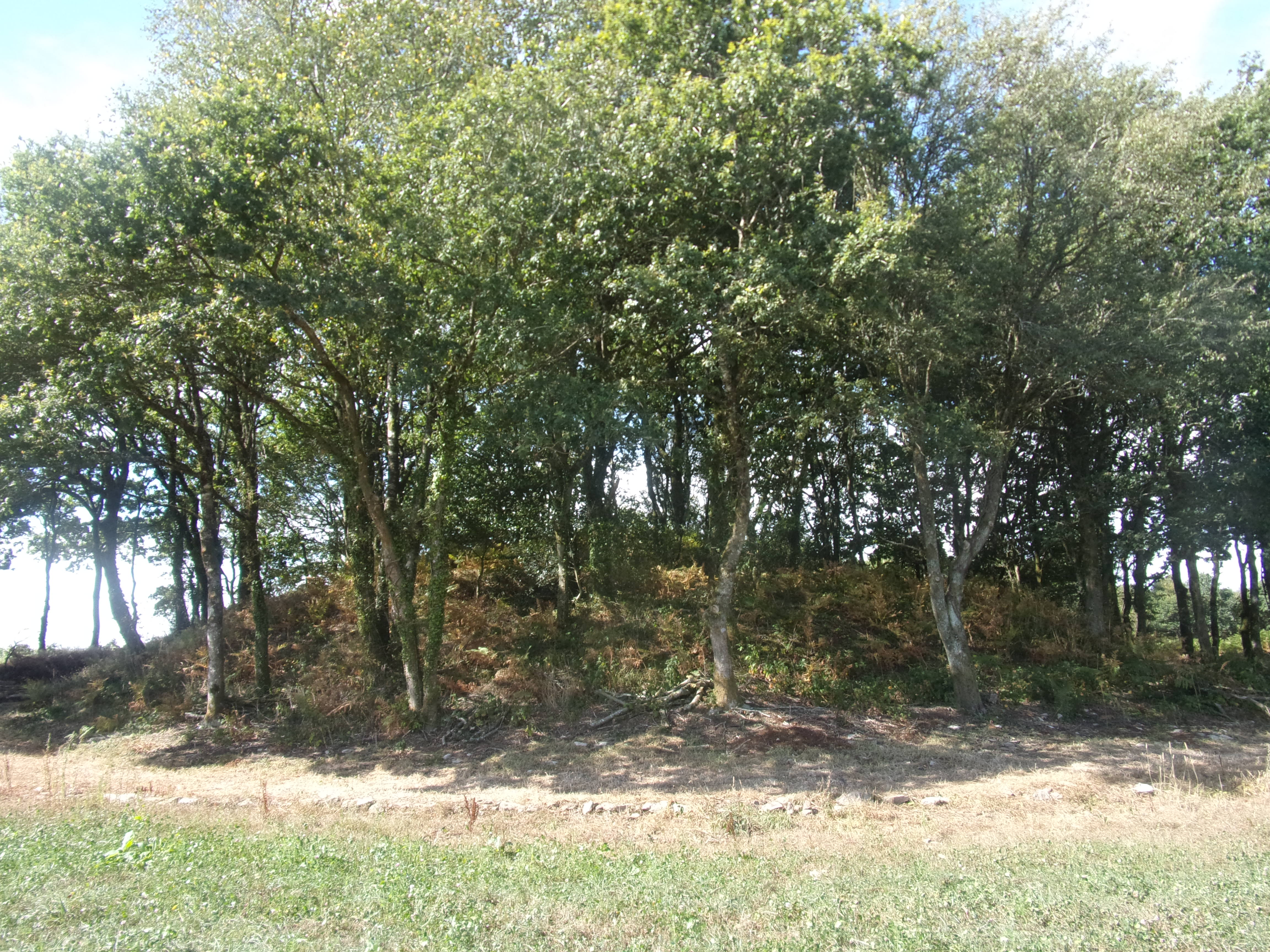
Kermain tumulus

== See also ==
- Wessex culture
- Bush Barrow
- Únětice culture
- Rhône culture
- Bell Beaker culture
- Tumulus culture
- British Bronze Age
- Atlantic Bronze Age

== Notes and Reference ==
=== Sources ===
- Briard, Jacques (1984). Les tumulus d'Armorique. L'Âge du Bronze en France. Vol. 3. Paris: Picard. ISBN 978-2708401068.
- Briard, Jacques; Bourhis, Jean; Warren, S. E. (1984). Les perles de faïence du Bronze ancien en Bretagne, méditerranéennes ou occidentales ?. pp. 55–62.
- Escats, Y (2011), Une enceinte et une nécropole de l'âge du Bronze à Lannion (PDF), Archéopages, vol. 3, pp. 26–27
- Fily, Muriel; Villard-Le Tiec, A; Menez, Y; Lorho, Thierry (2012). "Paysages funéraires de l'âge du Bronze dans le centre ouest de la Bretagne : approches multiscalaires". D. Bérenger, J. Bourgeois, M. Talon, S. Wirth (dir.), Gräberlandschaften der Bronzezeit, Internationales Kolloquium zur Bronzezeit, Herne, 15.–18. Oktober 2008 / Paysages funéraires de l‘âge du Bronze, Colloque international sur l‘âge du Bronze, Herne, 15–18 octobre 2008, Darmstadt, Verlag Philipp von Zabern (Bodenaltertümer Westfalens, 51): 59–76.
- "Actualités de l'archéologie préventive en France". Inrap (in French).
- Jacobs, Frank (17 March 2023). "Europe's Oldest Map Shows Tiny Bronze Age Kingdom". Atlas Obscura.
- Mordant, Claude (2013). "The Bronze Age in France". In Fokkens, H.; Harding, A. (eds.). The Oxford Handbook of the European Bronze Age. Oxford University Press.
- Needham, Stuart P. (2000). "Power Pulses Across a Cultural Divide: Cosmologically Driven Acquisition Between Armorica and Wessex". Proceedings of the Prehistoric Society. 66: 151–207. doi:10.1017/S0079497X00001808. ISSN 2050-2729. S2CID 110104915.
- "Sword - Tréboul-Saint-Brandan type". Neues Museum Berlin.
- Nicolas, Clément (2011). "Artisanats spécialisés et inégalités sociales à l'aube de la métallurgie : les pointes de flèches de type armoricain dans le nord du Finistère". Bulletin de la Société préhistorique française. 108 (1): 93–125. doi:10.3406/bspf.2011.13995. S2CID 192930436.
- Nicolas, C (2013). Symboles de pouvoir au temps de Stonehenge : les productions d'armatures de prestige de la Bretagne au Danemark (2500-1700 av. J.-C.) (PhD). Université de Paris 1 Panthéon-Sorbonne.
- Nicholas, Clement (November 2021). "An early 3D-map of a territory? the bronze age carved slab from Saint-Belec, Leuhan (Brittany, France)". Oxford Journal of Archaeology. 40 (4): 367–390. doi:10.1111/ojoa.12230. S2CID 244090619.
- Nicolas, Clément; Guéret, Colas (2014). "Armorican Arrowheads Biographies: Production and Function of an Early Bronze Age prestige good from Brittany (France)". Journal of Lithic Studies. 1 (2): 101–128. doi:10.2218/jls.v1i2.1126. ISSN 2055-0472. S2CID 161340697.
- Nicolas, Clément; Pailler, Yvan; Stephan, Pierre; Gandois, Henri (2013). "Les reliques de Lothéa (Quimperlé, Finistère) : une tombe aux connexions atlantiques entre Campaniforme et âge du Bronze ancien". Gallia Préhistoire. 55 (1): 181–227. doi:10.3406/galip.2013.2501. S2CID 190077827.
- Pailler, Yvan; Stéphan, Pierre; Gandois, Henri; Nicolas, Clément; Sparfel, Yohann; Tresset, Anne; Donnart, Klet; Fichaut, Bernard; Suanez, Serge; Dupont, Catherine; Clézio, Laurence Le; Marcoux, Nancy; Pineau, Amandine; Salanova, Laure; Sellami, Farid; Debue, Karyne; Josselin, Jérémie; Dietsch-Sellami, Marie-France (30 November 2011). "Évolution des paysages et occupation humaine en mer d'Iroise (Finistère, Bretagne) du Néolithique à l'Âge du Bronze". Norois. Environnement, aménagement, société (in French) (220): 39–68. doi:10.4000/norois.3662. ISSN 0029-182X. S2CID 194951196.
