= Bronze Age Britain =

Period in prehistoric Britain, c.2500–800 BC

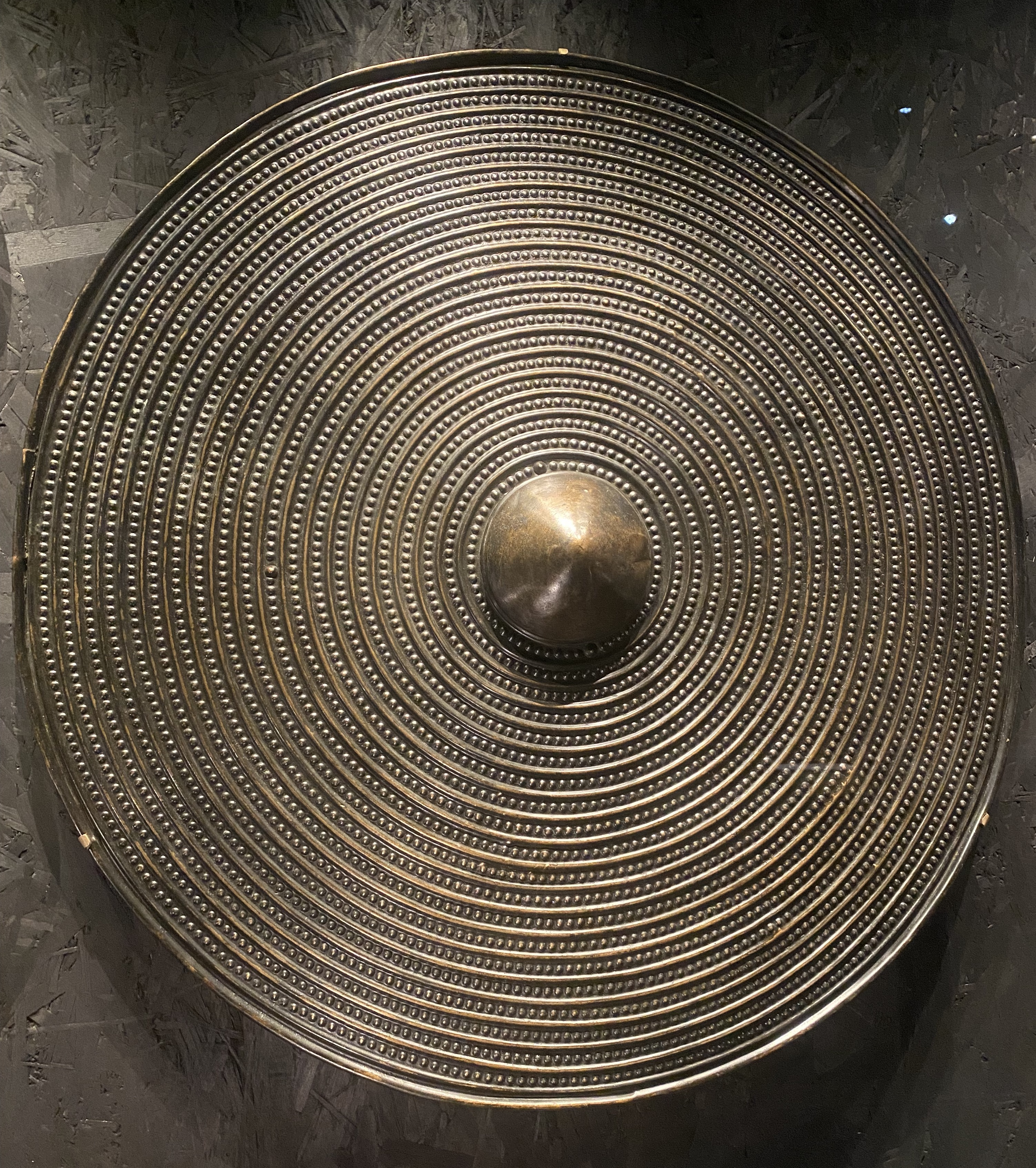
- The Rhos Rydd Shield
- Geographical range: British Isles
- Period: Bronze Age
- Dates: c. 2200 — c. 800 BC
- Preceded by: Bell Beaker culture, Neolithic British Isles
- Followed by: Atlantic Bronze Age, Iron Age Britain

The Bronze Age in Great Britain spanned from c. 2500–2200 BC until c. 800 BC. Lasting for about 1,700 years, it followed the Neolithic era (New Stone Age) and was in turn followed by the British Iron Age. It was marked by the use of copper and then bronze tools and other artifacts by the prehistoric peoples of Britain. The beginning of bronze metalworking in Britain is associated with the arrival of the Bell Beaker culture. The spread of this Bell Beaker culture to Britain was linked with the Indo-European migrations and a massive genetic shift, resulting in about 90% of Britain's gene pool being replaced within a few hundred years (from 2400 BC to 2000 BC), as people with Early European Farmer ancestry were mostly replaced by people with Western Steppe Herder ancestry. The Wessex culture was the main early Bronze Age culture in central and southern Britain.

During the British Bronze Age, large megalithic monuments similar to those from the Late Neolithic continued to be built or modified, including such sites as Avebury, Stonehenge, Silbury Hill and Must Farm. That has been described as a time "when elaborate ceremonial practices emerged among some communities of subsistence agriculturalists of western Europe". Britain was the first region in Europe to fully adopt tin-bronze technology, in the period 2200–2100 BC, and southwestern Britain was a major source of tin for mainland Europe and the Mediterranean. It has been proposed that Celtic language and culture emerged in Britain during the Bronze Age.

== History ==
=== Early Bronze Age (EBA), c. 2500–1500 BC ===
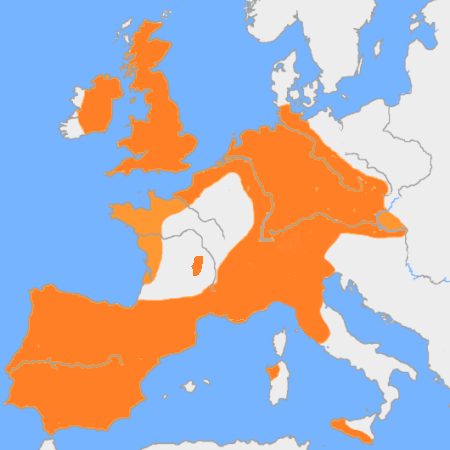
Extent of the Bell Beaker culture

There is no clear consensus on the date for the beginning of the Bronze Age in Great Britain and Ireland. Some sources give a date as late as 2000 BC, and others set 2200 BC as the demarcation between the Neolithic and the Bronze Age. The period from 2500 BC to 2000 BC has been called the "Late Neolithic/Early Bronze Age" in recognition of the difficulty of exactly defining the boundary. Some archaeologists recognise a British Chalcolithic when copper was used between the 25th and the 22nd centuries BC, but others do not because production and use were on a small scale.

- 2500–2000 BC: Mount Pleasant Phase, Early Bell Beaker culture: copper+tin.
- 2100–1900 BC: Late Beaker: knives, tanged spearheads (Bush Barrow; Wessex I; Overton Period).
- 1800–1600 BC: Fargo Phase (see correction at Bedd Branwen Period); burials.

=== Middle Bronze Age (MBA), 1500–1000 BC ===
- 1500–1300 BC: Acton Park Phase: palstaves, socketed spearheads; copper+tin, also lead.
- 1300–1200 BC: Knighton Heath Period; "rapiers."
- 1200–1000 BC: Early Urnfield; Wilburton-Wallington Phase.

=== Late Bronze Age (LBA), 1000–700 BC ===
- 1000–900 BC: Late Urnfield: socketed axes, palstaves (also lead).
- 800–700 BC: Ewart Park Phase, Llyn Fawr Phase: leaf-shaped swords.

In Ireland, the final Dowris phase of the Late Bronze Age appears to decline in about 600 BC, but iron metallurgy does not appear until about 550 BC.

== Development ==
=== Bell Beaker culture and migration ===
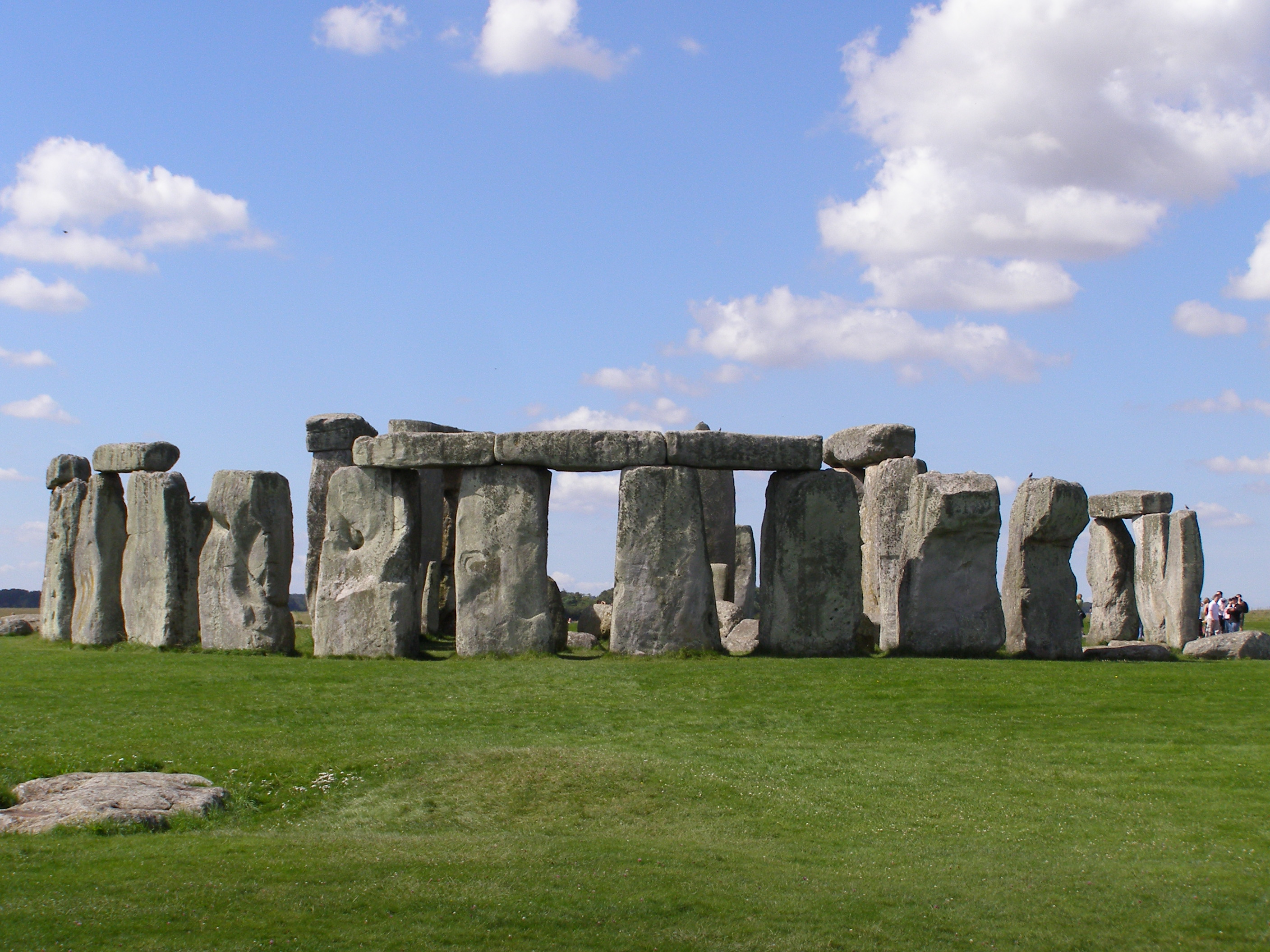
Stonehenge ruins, c. 2500 BC

Around 2500 BC, a new pottery style arrived in Great Britain: the Bell Beaker culture. Beaker pottery appears in the Mount Pleasant Phase (2700–2000 BC), along with flat axes and the burial practice of inhumation. People of this period were responsible for building Seahenge, along with the later phases of Stonehenge. Silbury Hill was also built in the early Beaker period. A 2018 archaeogenetics study found that the spread of the Bell Beaker culture to Britain was linked with the Indo-European migrations and a massive genetic shift. It resulted in about 90% of Britain's gene pool being replaced within a few hundred years (from 2400 BC to 2000 BC), as people with Early European Farmer ancestry were mostly replaced by people with Western Steppe Herder ancestry. These people were most genetically similar to the Bell Beaker people of the Lower Rhine region. The authors of the study said that the spread of the Bell Beaker culture and this population turnover might be linked with the spread of Celtic language to Britain. Movement of continental Europeans brought new people to the islands from the continent. Recent tooth enamel isotope research on bodies found in early Bronze Age graves around Stonehenge indicates that at least some of the new arrivals came from the area of modern Switzerland. According to the evolutionary geneticist Ian Barnes, "Following the Beaker spread, there was a population in Britain that for the first time had ancestry and skin and eye pigmentation similar to Britons today".

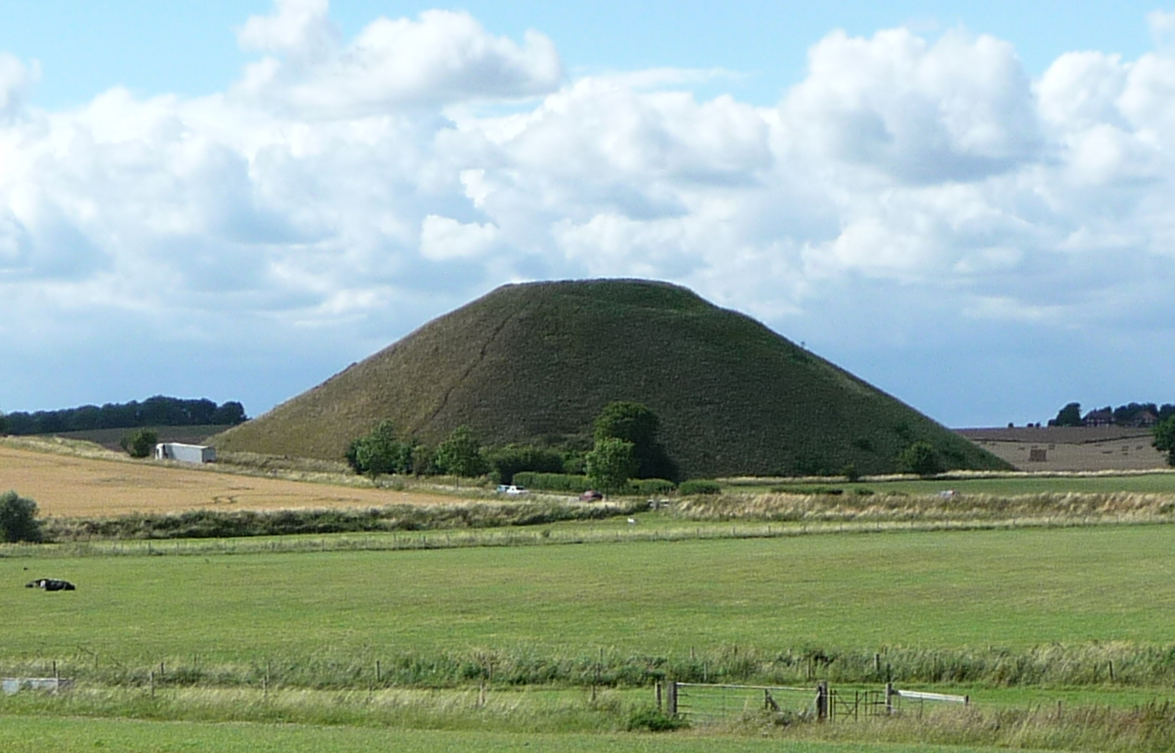
Silbury Hill, c. 2400 BC

Many of the early henge sites seem to have been adopted by the newcomers. Furthermore, a fundamentally different approach to burying the dead began. In contrast to the Neolithic practice of communal burials, the Bronze Age society undergoes an apparent shift towards focusing on to the individual, rather on the ancestors as a collective. For example, in the Neolithic era, a large chambered cairn or long barrow was used to house the dead. The 'Early Bronze Age' saw people buried in individual barrows, also commonly known and marked on modern British Ordnance Survey maps as tumuli, or sometimes in cists covered with cairns. They were often buried with a beaker alongside the body. However, even though customs changed, barrows and burial mounds continued to be used during the Bronze Age, with smaller tombs often dug into the primary mounds.

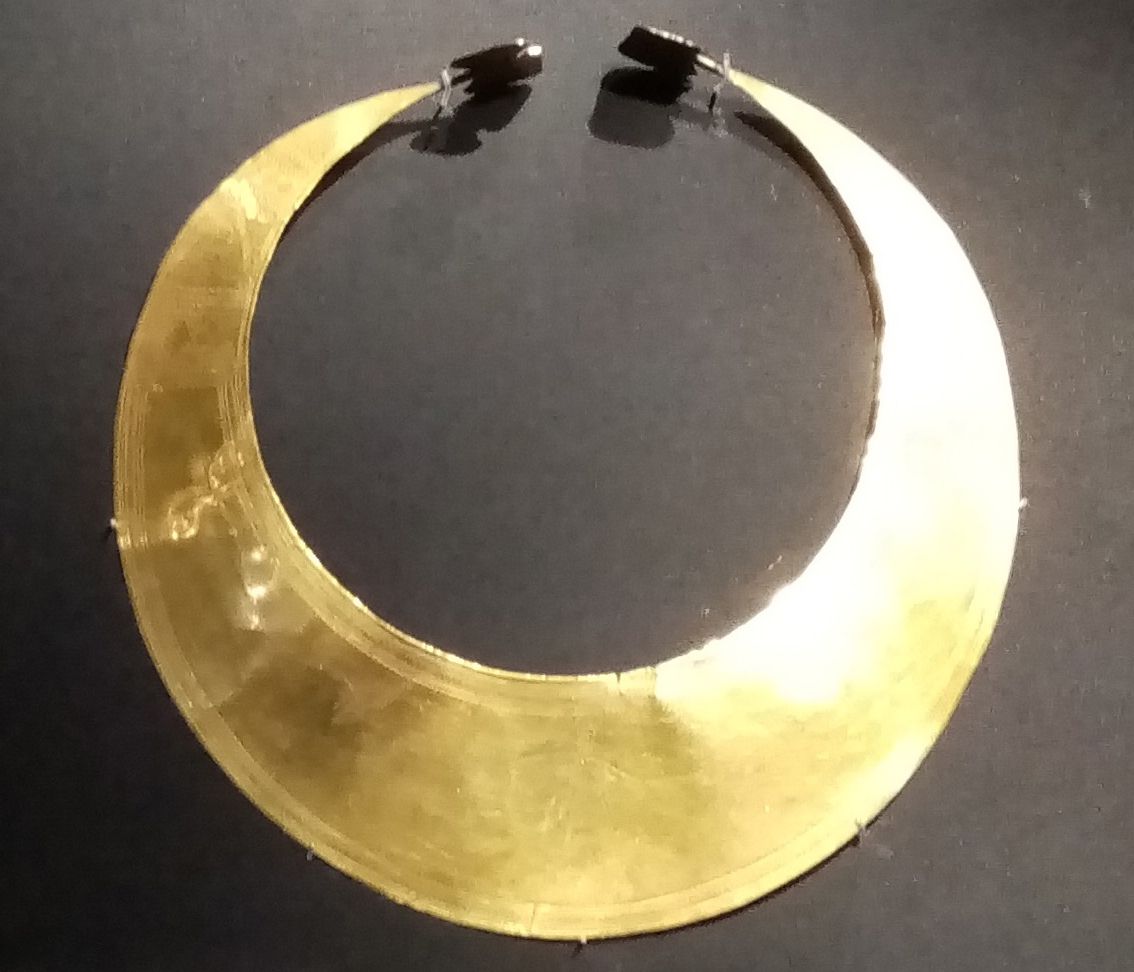
Gold lunula, c. 2400–2000 BC

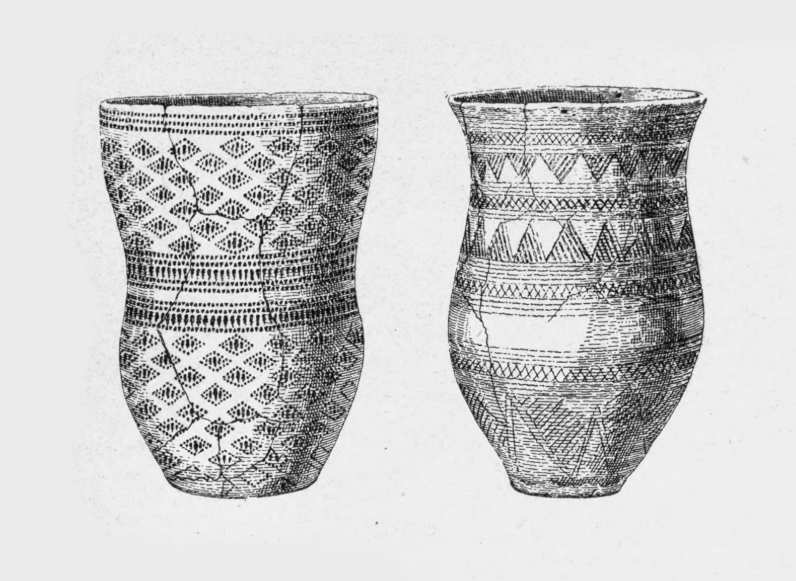
Bell Beakers from England, c. 2500 BC

The most famous site in Britain from this period is Stonehenge, which had its Neolithic form elaborated extensively. Many barrows surround it and an unusual number of 'rich' burials can be found nearby, such as the Amesbury Archer and the later Bush Barrow.

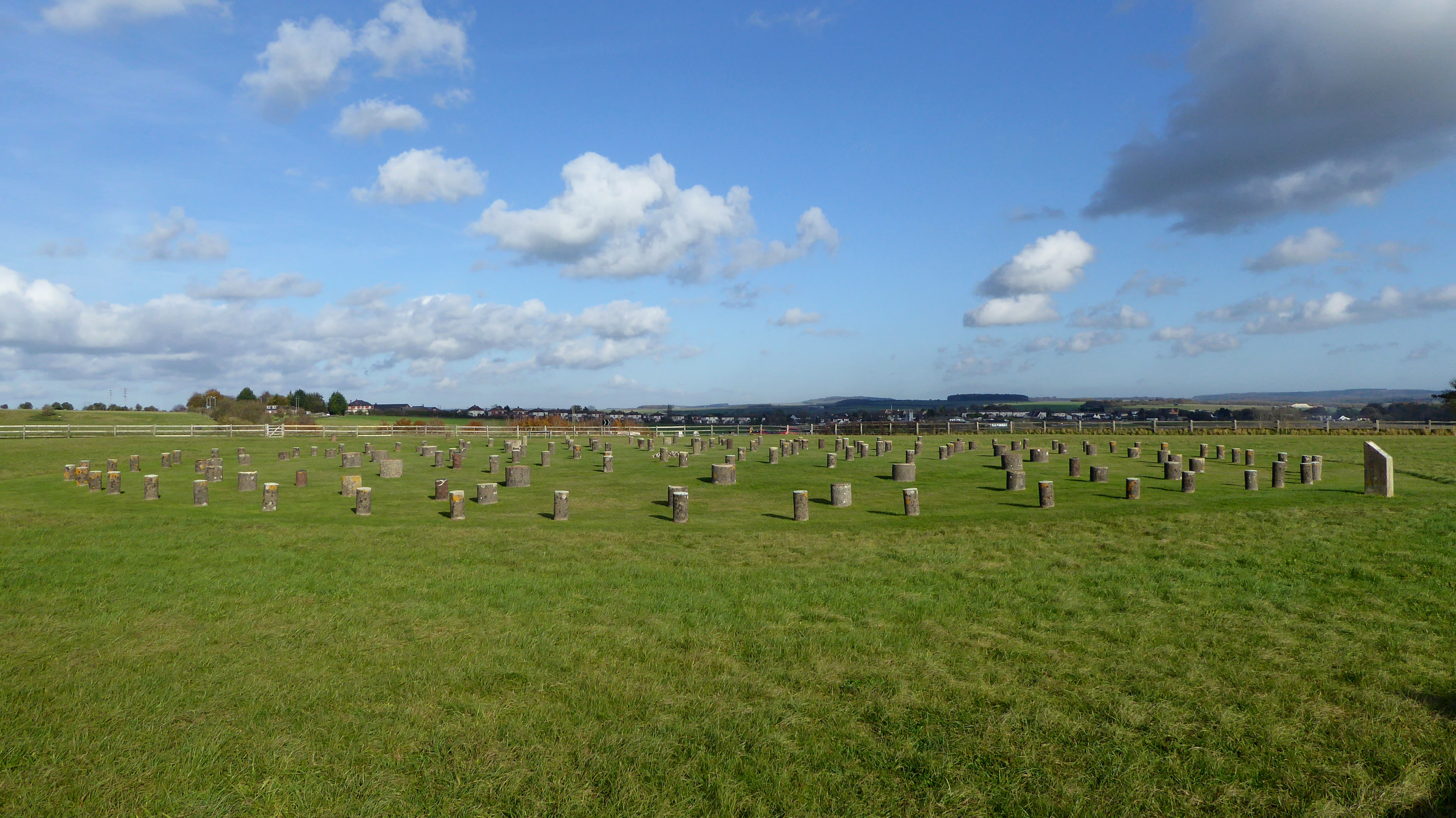
The layout of posts at Woodhenge

Close similarities have been noted between Stonehenge and the Pömmelte circular enclosure in central Germany, which was built by Bell Beaker people around 2300 BC. Large timber circles in Britain such as Woodhenge, near to Stonehenge, are similarly dated to the early Beaker period or just before the Beaker period. Some researchers have suggested that Woodhenge may have been a monumental roofed building, though it is usually thought to have been an open-air structure. Other large circular timber structures, such as the Southern Circle inside the Durrington Walls enclosure, may have also been roofed buildings.

The Beaker people also introduced novel practices such as mummification, burial in log coffins and cranial deformation to Britain.

The archaeologist Timothy Darvill has argued that Stonehenge functioned as a solar calendar, reflecting the spread of solar cosmologies across Northern Europe in the third millennium BC. Other researchers have emphasized the lunar aspects of Stonehenge, such as the apparent alignment of the Station Stone rectangle with the Major Lunar Standstill, which occurs every 18.6 years. Various other astronomical interpretations have been proposed, such as the theory put forward by the astronomers Gerald Hawkins and Fred Hoyle that the ring of 56 Aubrey Holes could have been used to predict lunar eclipses. The 19 stones of the Inner (bluestone) Horseshoe may also represent knowledge of the 19-year lunisolar Metonic cycle. According to the archaeologist Euan MacKie, Stonehenge recorded both the solar and lunar cycles "in an ingenious design based on Pythagorean triangles", reflecting the geometric relations of astronomical events (such as the solstices and lunar standstills) as they appear at the specific latitude of Stonehenge (51° North). A similar understanding of geometry and astronomy is thought to be demonstrated by the design of early Bronze Age artefacts such as the gold 'lozenge' from Bush Barrow, dating from c. 1950 BC.

=== Bronze ===
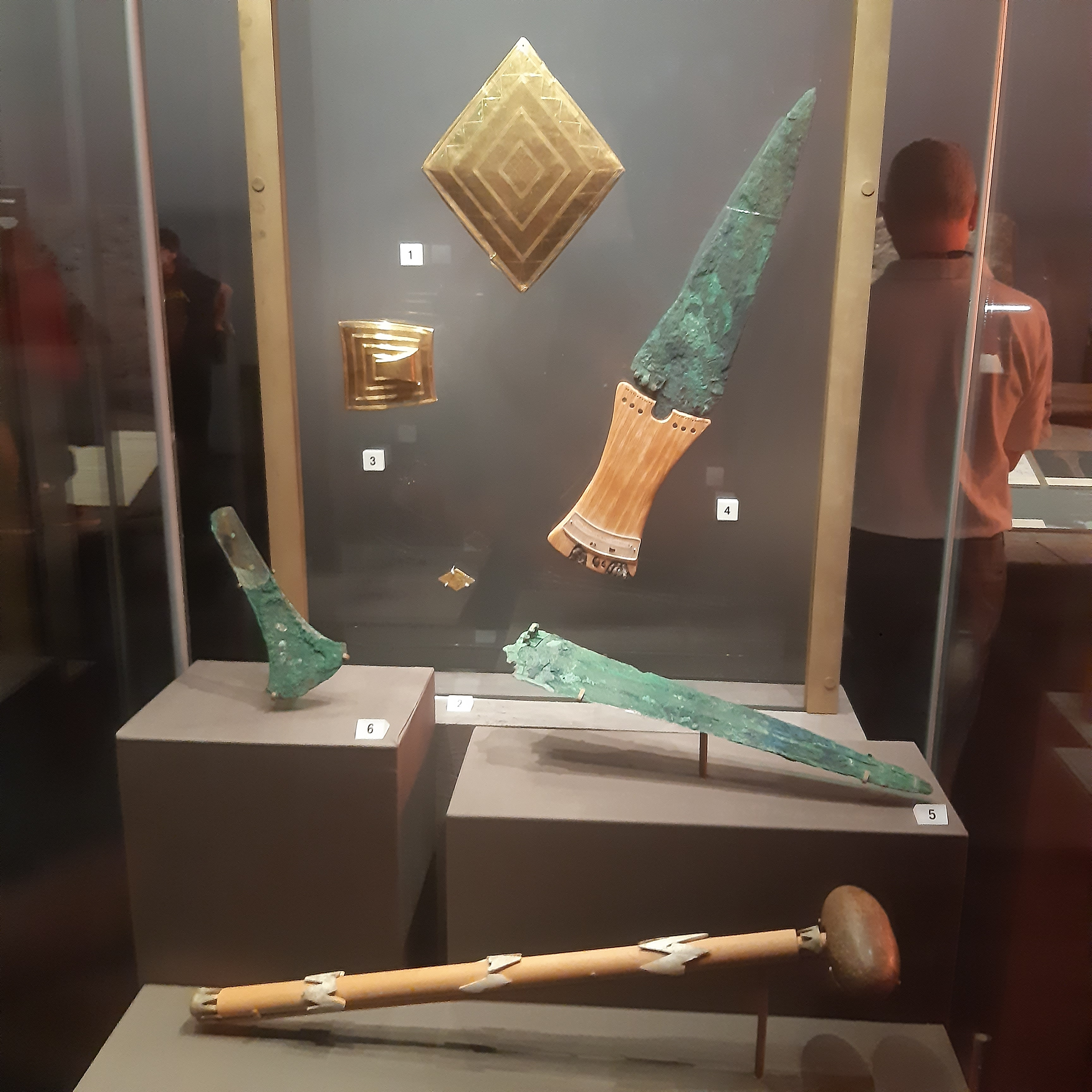
Finds from the Bush Barrow elite grave, near to Stonehenge, c. 1950 BC

Several regions of origin have been postulated for the Beaker culture, notably the Iberian Peninsula, the Netherlands and Central Europe. Part of the Beaker culture brought the skill of refining metal to Great Britain in around 2500 BC. At first, they made items from copper, gold and arsenical bronze, but by 2200 BC smiths had discovered how to make tin-bronze, which is much harder than copper, by mixing copper with a small amount of tin. With that discovery, the Bronze Age began in Great Britain. High-tin bronze and tin-bronze itself may have been discovered and developed independently in Britain.

Britain had large reserves of tin in what is now Cornwall and Devon in South West England (the largest in Europe and among the largest in the world), and South West England has the earliest evidence for tin ore exploitation in Europe. In the period 2200-2100 BC Britain became the first region in Europe to fully adopt tin-bronze technology and switch all metalwork from copper and arsenical bronze to full tin-bronze. This full adoption subsequently occurred across Scandinavia and Central Europe by around 1800 BC and later in southern Iberia, the Aegean (Greece) and Egypt by around 1500/1300 BC.

"A remarkable change occurred in the period c. 2200–2100 BC when Britain was the first region in Europe to completely switch all metalwork from (arsenical) copper to full tin-bronze."

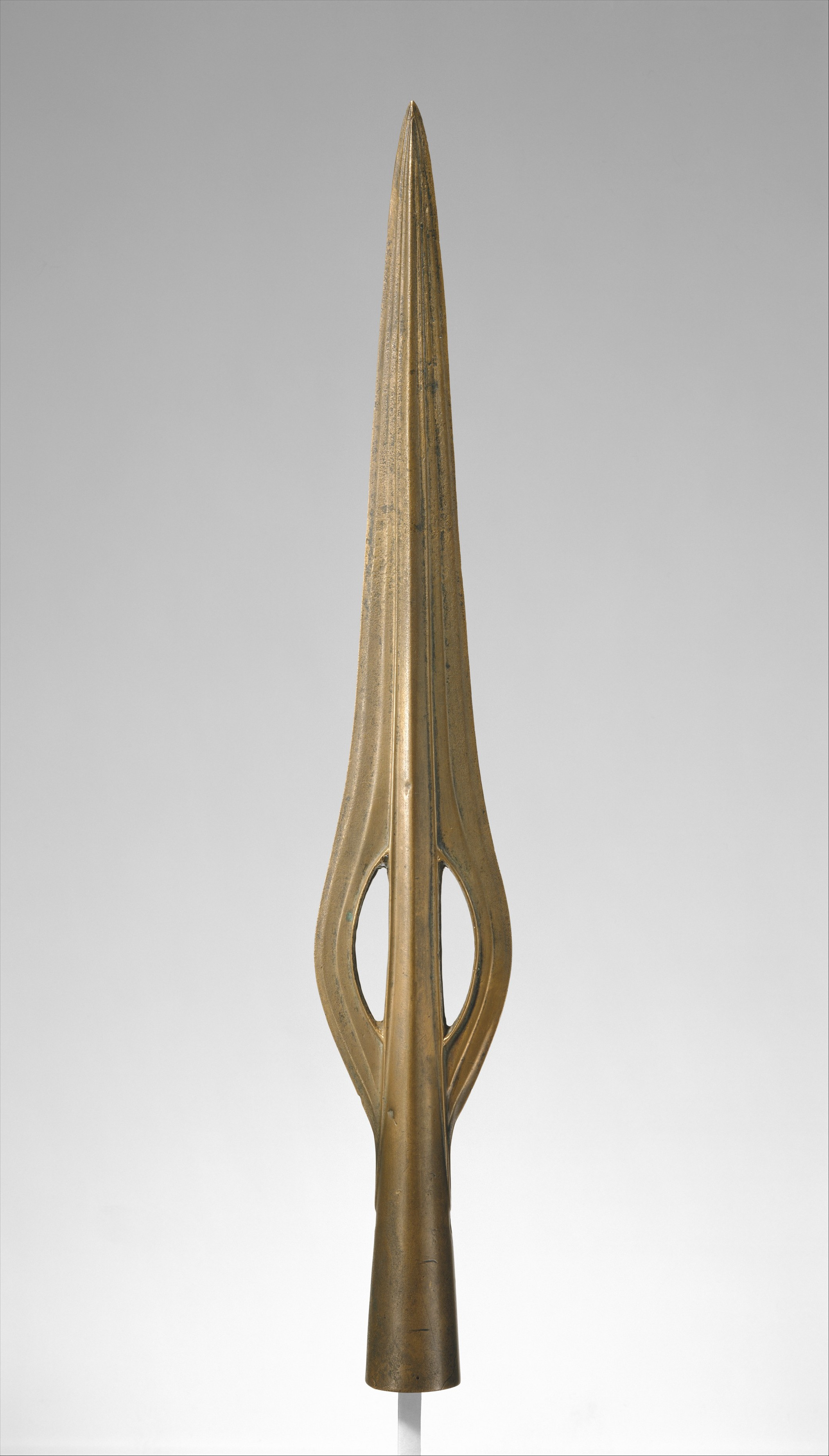
Bronze spearhead, 1200–800 BC

An analysis of Bronze Age–Early Iron Age tin ingots recovered from four Mediterranean shipwrecks off the coasts of Israel and southern France found that they originated from tin ores in south-west Britain. According to Williams et al. (2025), "the ‘bronzization’ of the East Mediterranean, occurring 1500–1300 BC, was primarily driven by European tin sources, particularly from south-west Britain, rather than Central Asian sources." This situation is reflected in later writings by the Greek historian Herodotus (c. 450 BC), who referred to the Cassiterides or 'tin islands' in the distant northwest as the source for Mediterranean tin. The importance of Britain as a source of tin is also reflected in evidence for connections between elites of the Wessex culture and elites in Bronze Age Greece, notably displayed in the rich Bush Barrow burial next to Stonehenge, dating from c. 1950 BC.

Copper was exported to the continent from sites such as the Great Orme mine in northern Wales, as was gold from Cornwall (notably used to make the Nebra Sky Disc associated with the Únětice culture in central Europe). Gold from Cornwall was also exported to Ireland where it was used to make Bronze Age artefacts such as gold lunulae.

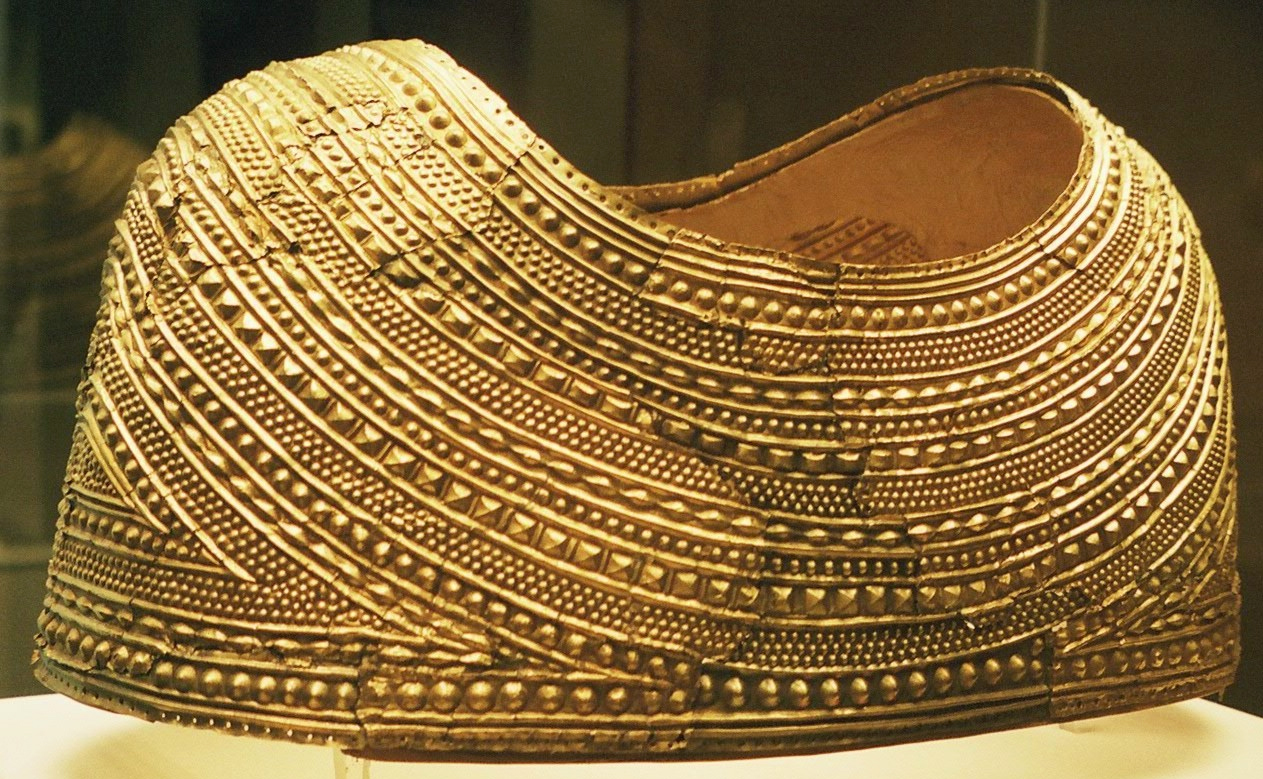
The gold Mold Cape, c. 1900–1600 BC

Bronze axeheads, made by casting, were at first similar to their stone predecessors but then developed a socket for the wooden handle to fit into and a small loop or ring to make lashing the two together easier. Groups of unused axes are often found together, suggesting ritual deposits. Bronze swords of a graceful "leaf" shape, swelling gently from the handle before coming to a tip, have been found in considerable numbers, along with spear heads and arrow points.

Bronze Age Britons were also skilled at making jewellery from gold, as well as occasional objects like the Rillaton Cup and Mold Cape. Many examples have been found in graves of the wealthy Wessex culture of Southern Britain, but they are not as frequent as Irish finds. The earliest gold objects include gold lunulae, dating from c. 2400-2000 BC.

The greatest quantities of bronze objects found in what is now England were discovered in East Cambridgeshire, where the most important finds were recovered in Isleham (more than 6500 pieces).

The earliest known metalworking building was found at Sigwells, Somerset, England. Several casting mould fragments were fitted to a Wilburton type sword held in Somerset County Museum. They were found in association with cereal grain that has been dated to the 12th century BC by carbon dating.

From the 13th century BC there is evidence for the use of standardised weights and weighing equipment in the trade of metals. Small gold rings have been interpreted as a possible form of 'ring-money'.

=== Wessex culture ===
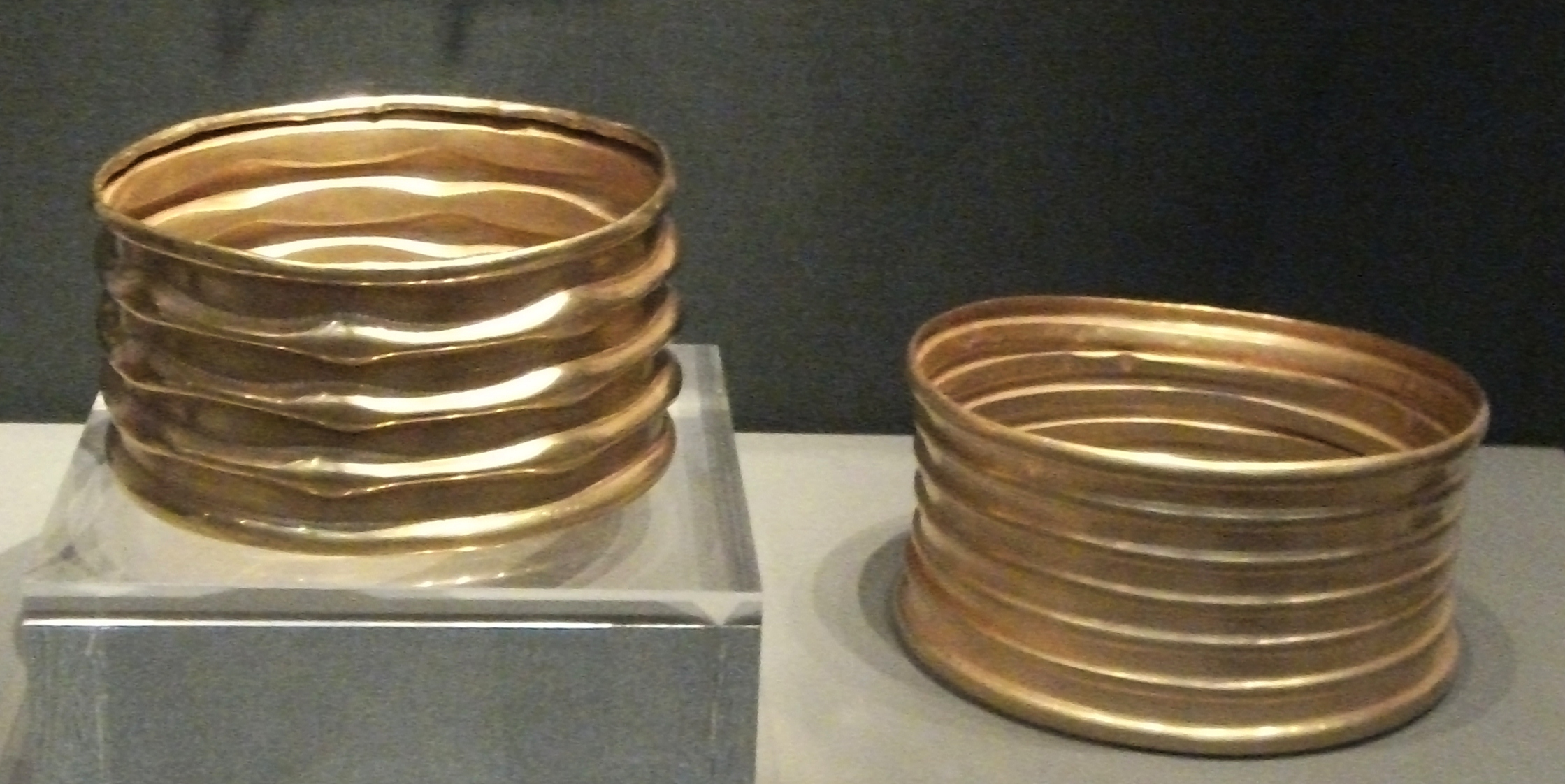
Lockington gold armrings, c. 2100–1900 BC

The rich Wessex culture developed in southern Great Britain during that time. The weather, previously warm and dry, became much wetter as the Bronze Age continued, which forced the population away from easily defended sites in the hills and into the fertile valleys. Large livestock farms developed in the lowlands which appear to have contributed to economic growth and inspired increasing forest clearances.

=== Deverel-Rimbury culture ===
The Deverel-Rimbury culture began to emerge during the second half of the 'Middle Bronze Age' (c. 1400–1100 BC) to exploit the wetter conditions. Cornwall was a major source of tin for much of western Europe and copper was extracted from sites such as the Great Orme mine in Northern Wales. Social groups appear to have been tribal, but growing complexity and hierarchies became apparent.

=== Disruption of cultural patterns ===
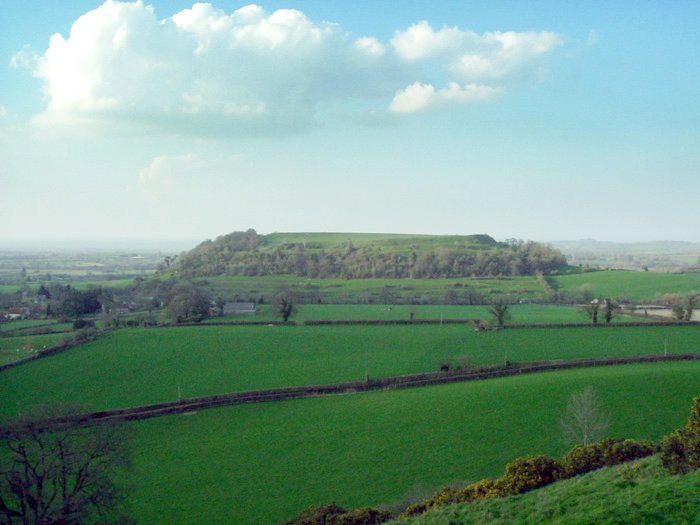
Cadbury Castle Late Bronze Age hillfort

There is evidence of a relatively large-scale disruption of cultural patterns (see Late Bronze Age collapse), which some scholars think may indicate an invasion (or at least a migration) into Southern Great Britain around the 12th century BC. The disruption was felt far beyond Britain, even beyond Europe, as most of the great Near Eastern empires collapsed (or experienced severe difficulties), and the Sea Peoples harried the entire Mediterranean basin around that time. Cremation was adopted as a burial practice, with cemeteries of urns containing cremated individuals appearing in the archaeological record. According to John T. Koch and others, the Celtic languages developed during the Late Bronze Age period in an intensely-trading-networked culture called the Atlantic Bronze Age, which included Britain, Ireland, France, Spain and Portugal, but that stands in contrast to the more generally-accepted view that the Celtic languages developed earlier than that, with some cultural practices developing in the Hallstatt culture.

=== Late Bronze Age migration ===
In 2021, a major archaeogenetics study uncovered a migration into southern Britain during the 500-year period from 1300 to 800 BC. The newcomers were genetically most similar to ancient individuals from Gaul and had higher levels of Early European Farmers ancestry. From 1000 to 875 BC, their genetic marker swiftly spread through southern Britain (roughly England and Wales), making up around half the ancestry of subsequent Iron Age people in that area, but not in northern Britain. The "evidence suggests that, rather than a violent invasion or a single migratory event, the genetic structure of the population changed through sustained contacts between Britain and mainland Europe over several centuries, such as the movement of traders, intermarriage, and small scale movements of family groups". The authors describe this as a "plausible vector for the spread of early Celtic languages into Britain". There was much less migration into Britain during the Iron Age, so it is more likely that Celtic language reached Britain before then. Barry Cunliffe suggests that a branch of Celtic was already being spoken in Britain and that the late Bronze Age migration introduced the Brittonic branch. The study also found that lactose tolerance rose swiftly in early Iron Age Britain, a thousand years before it became widespread in mainland Europe, which suggests that milk became a very important foodstuff in Britain at this time.

== Gallery ==
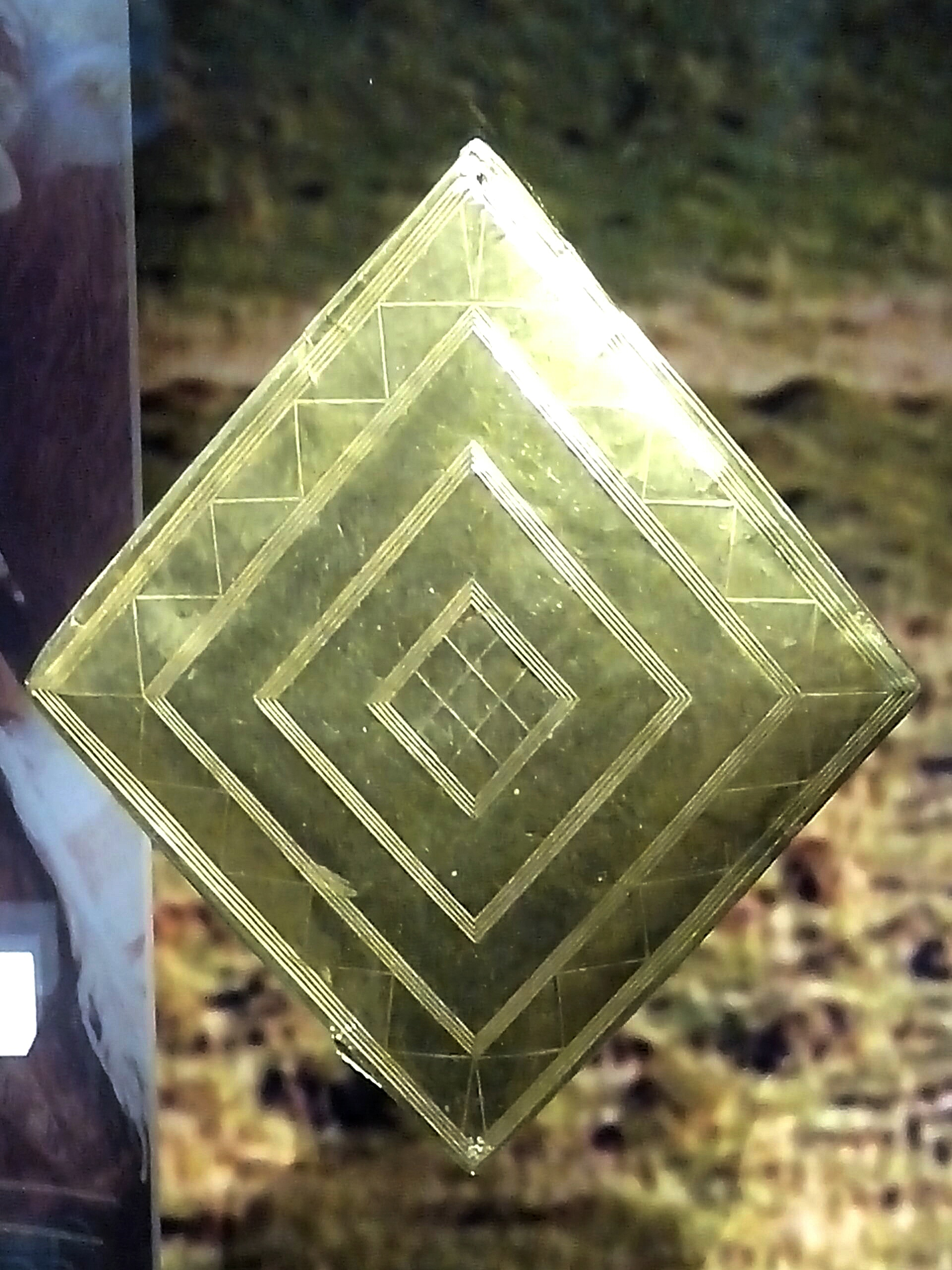
The Bush Barrow gold lozenge, c. 1950 BC

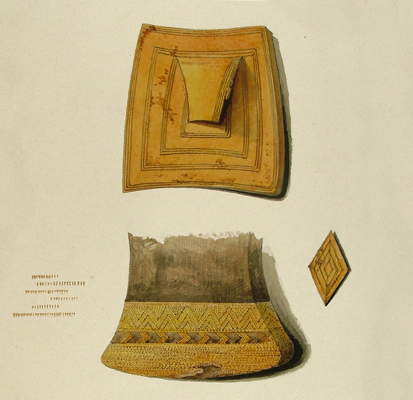
Gold belt plate and dagger hilt from Bush Barrow, 1950 BC

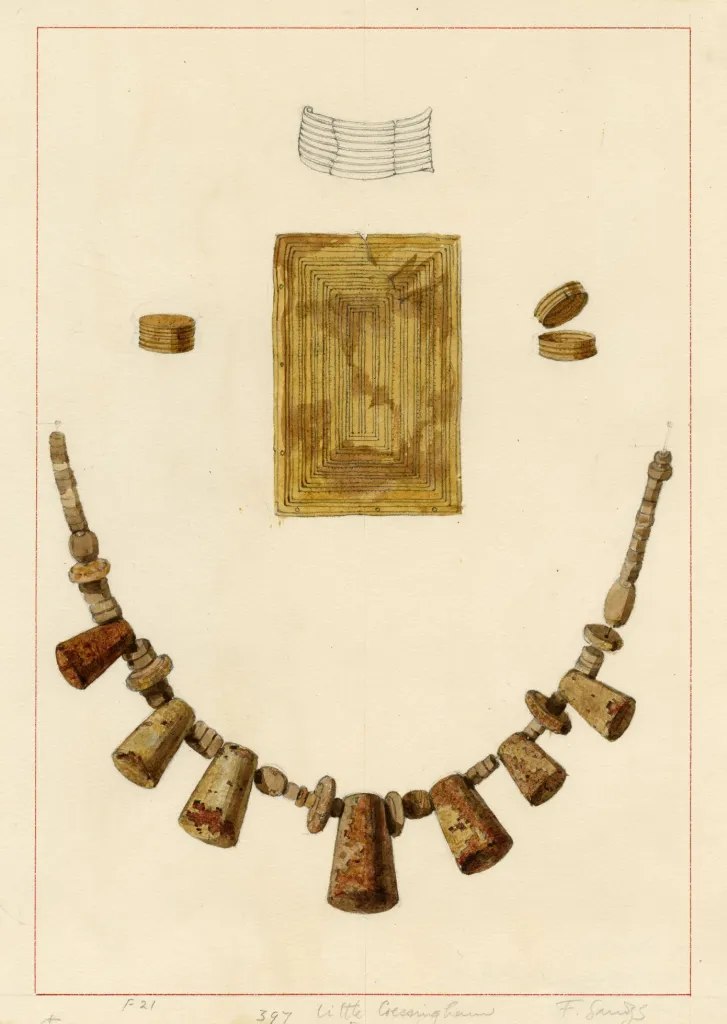
Gold plaque and amber necklace, c. 2000 BC

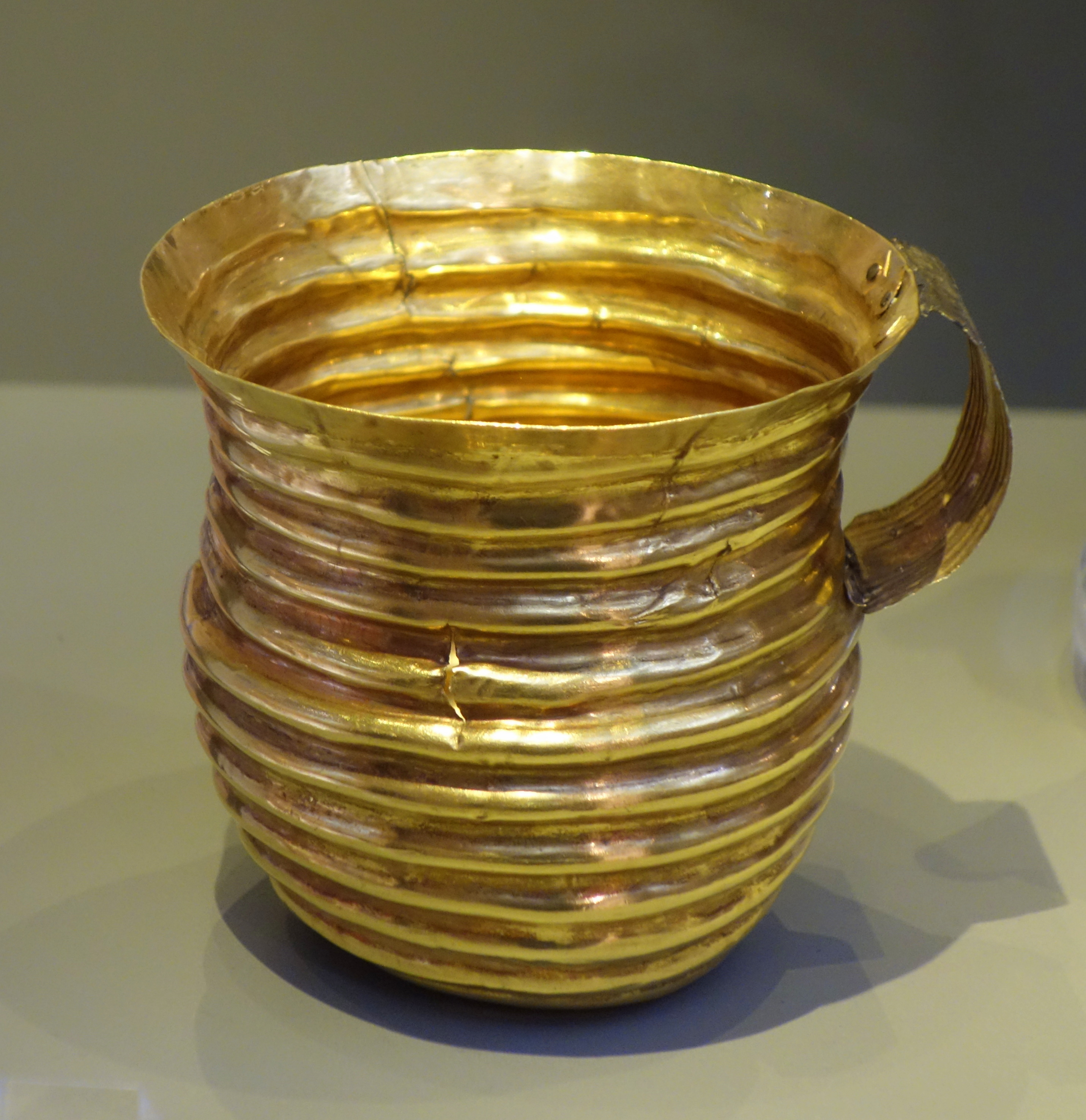
Rillaton gold cup, c. 1700 BC

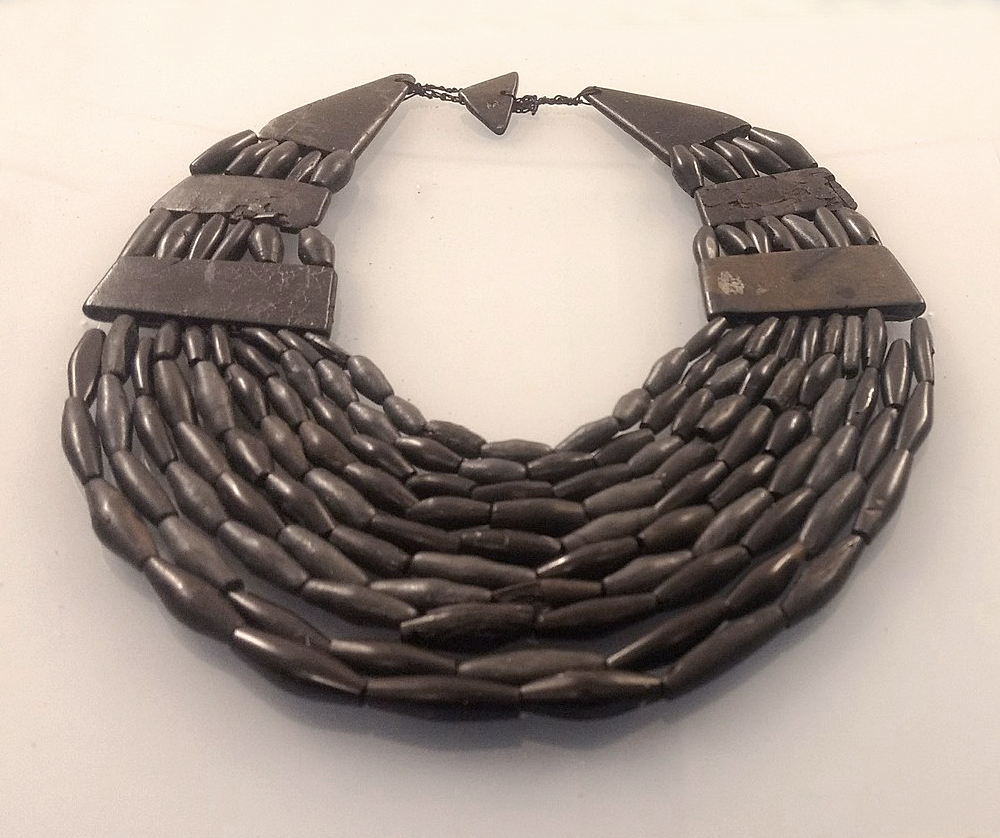
Jet necklace, Scotland, c. 2140-1900 BC

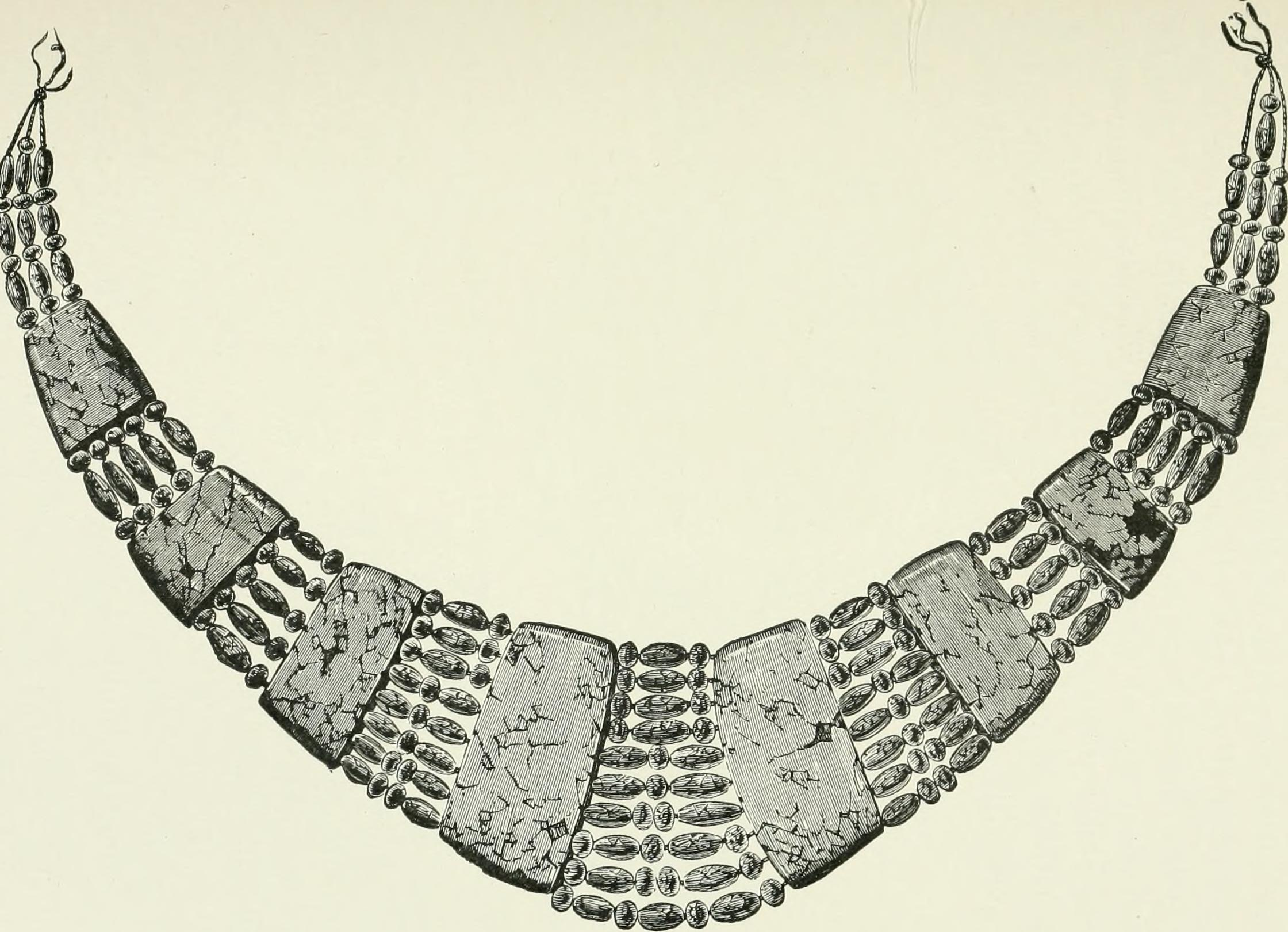
Amber necklace, England

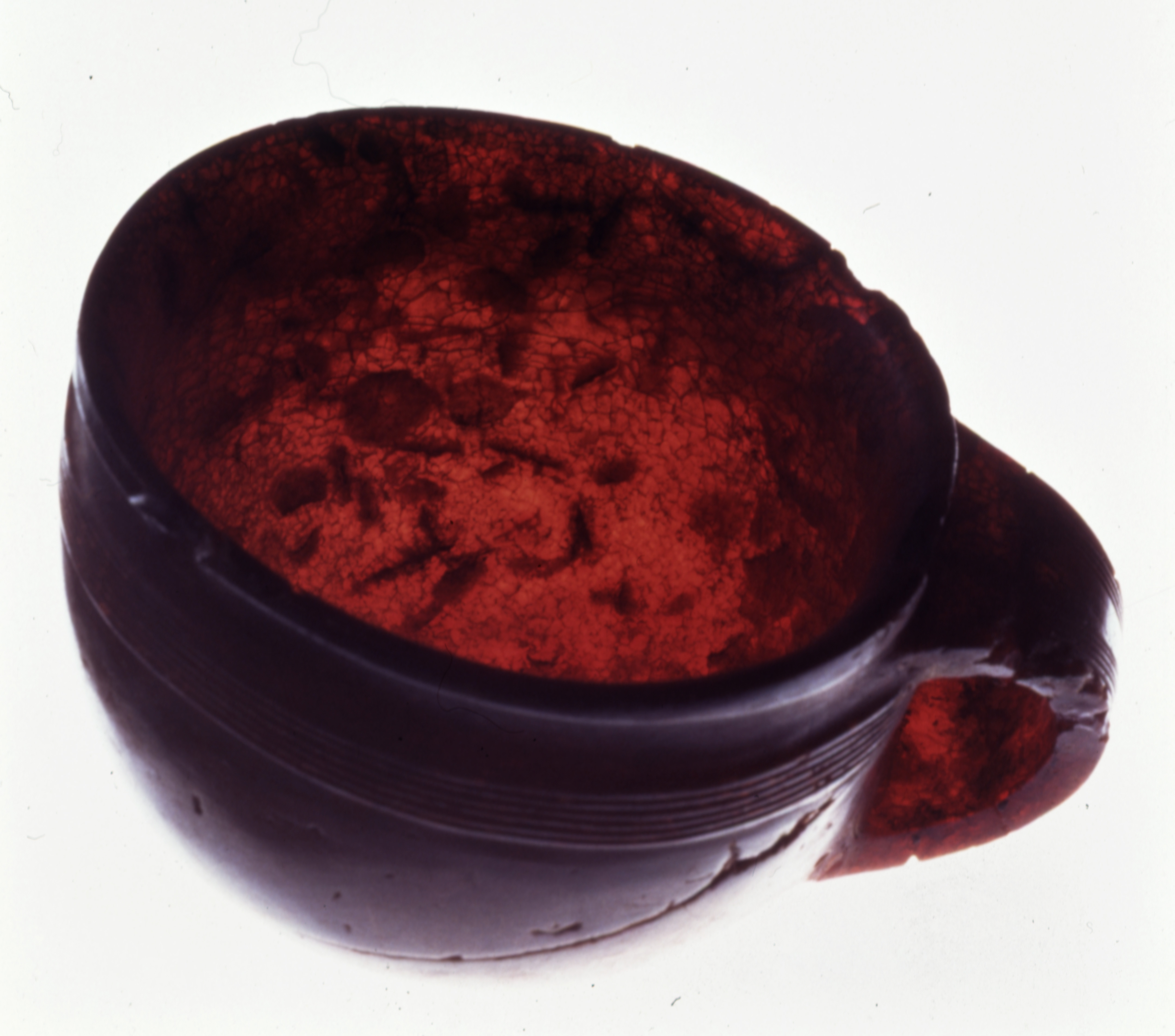
Hove amber cup, c. 1700 BC

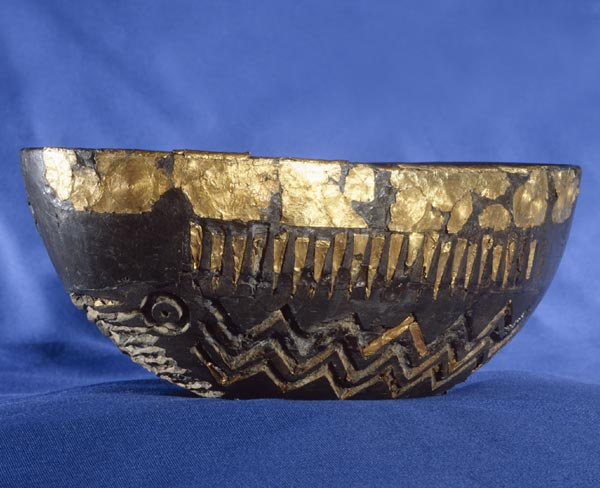
Caergwrle Bowl, Wales, c. 1300 BC

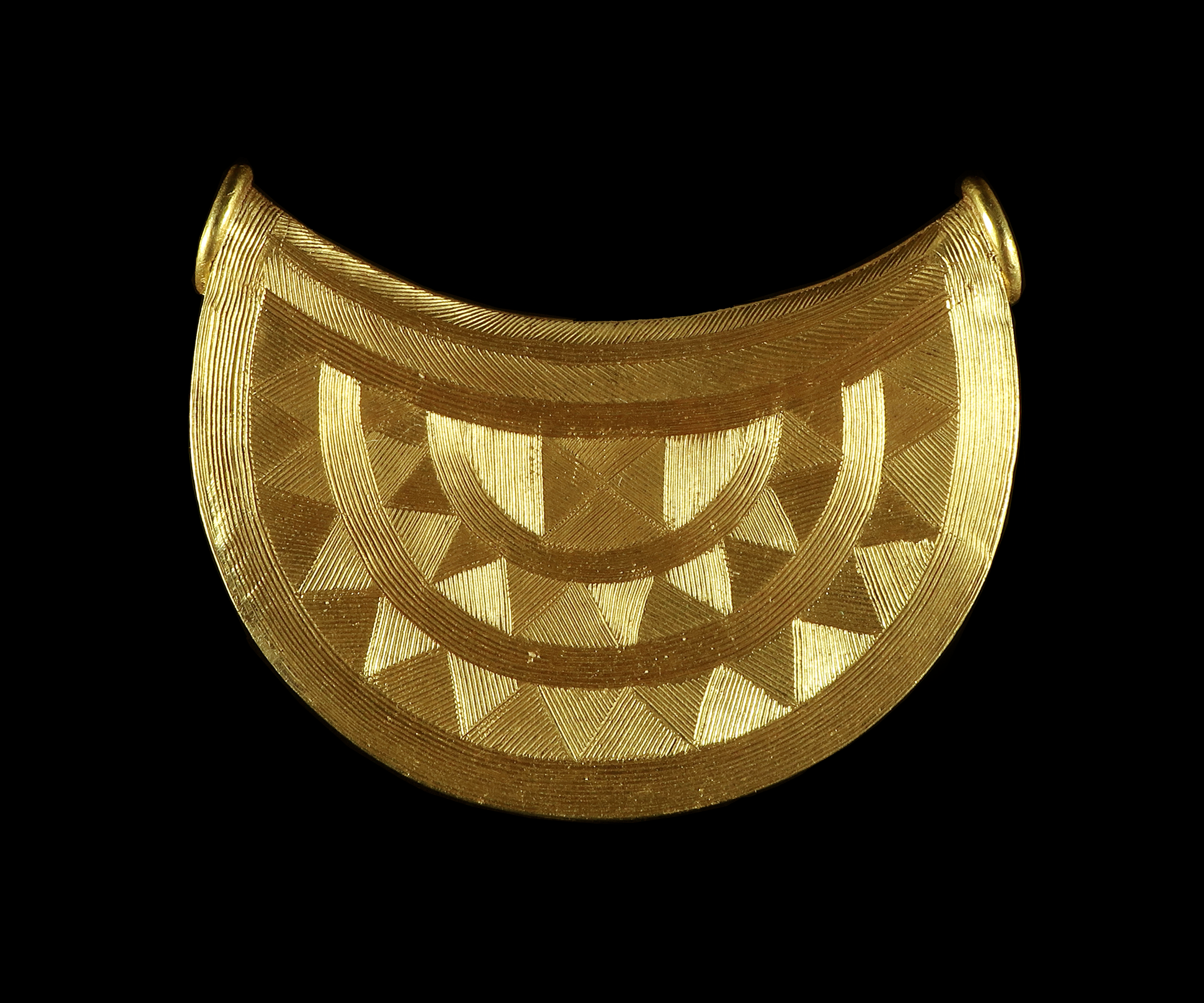
The Shropshire bulla, c. 1000 BC

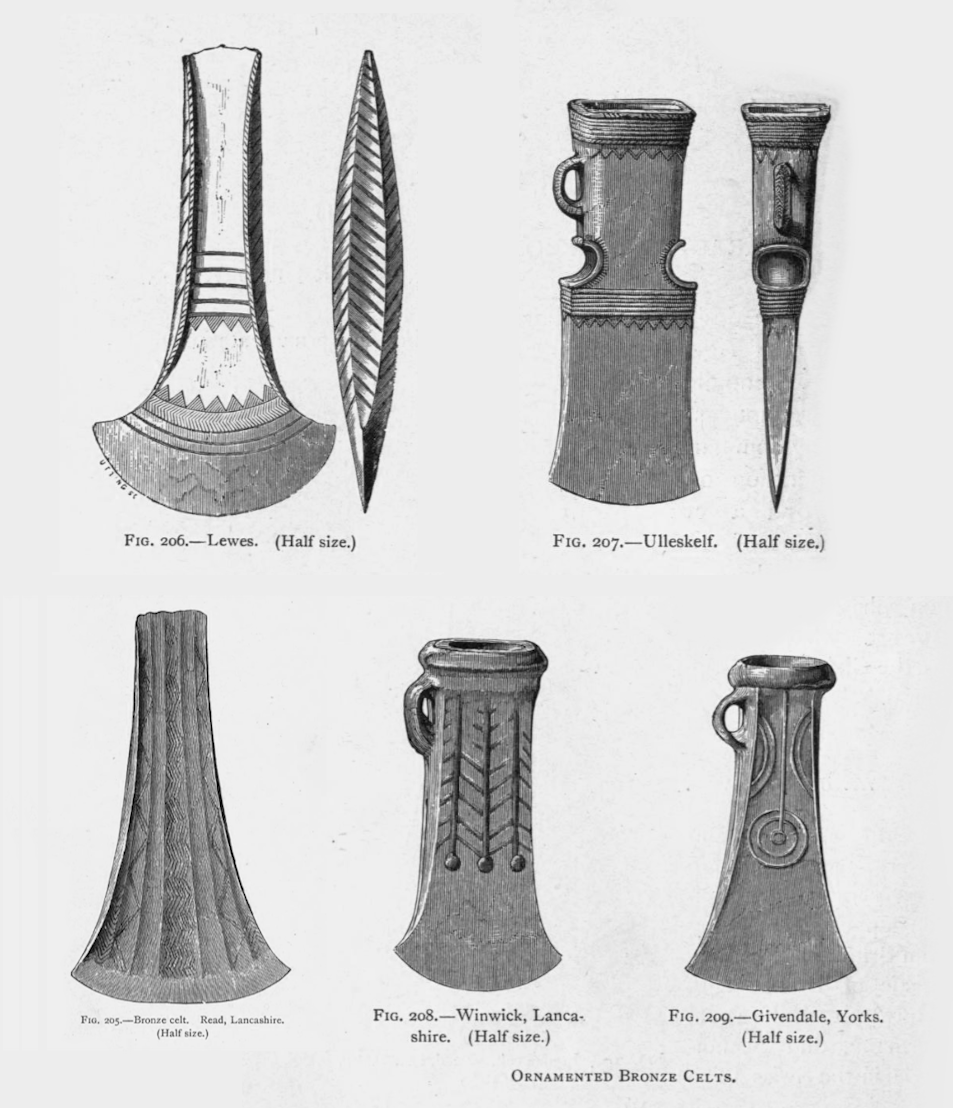
Bronze axes, England

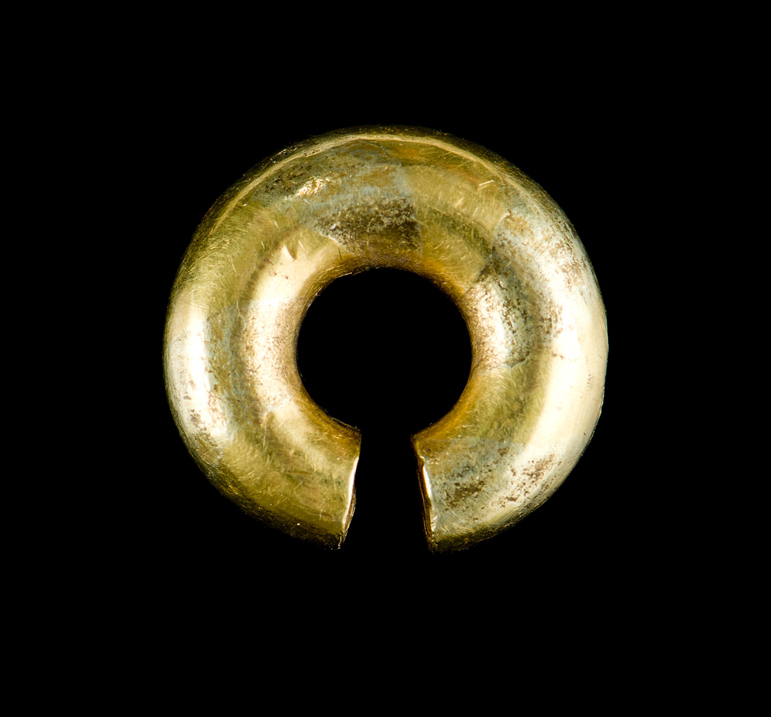
Gold 'ring-money'

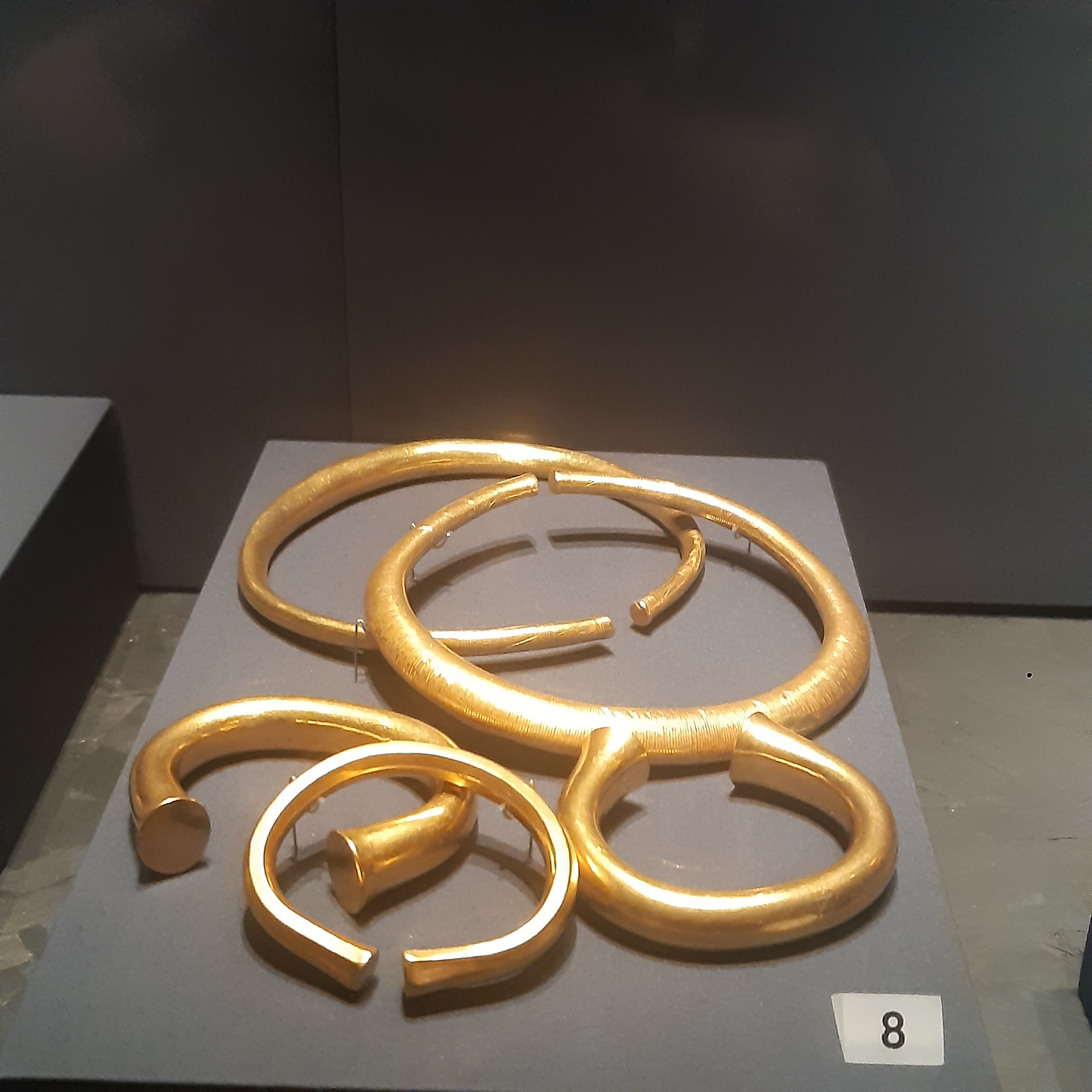
Gold hoard, England, 1000 BC

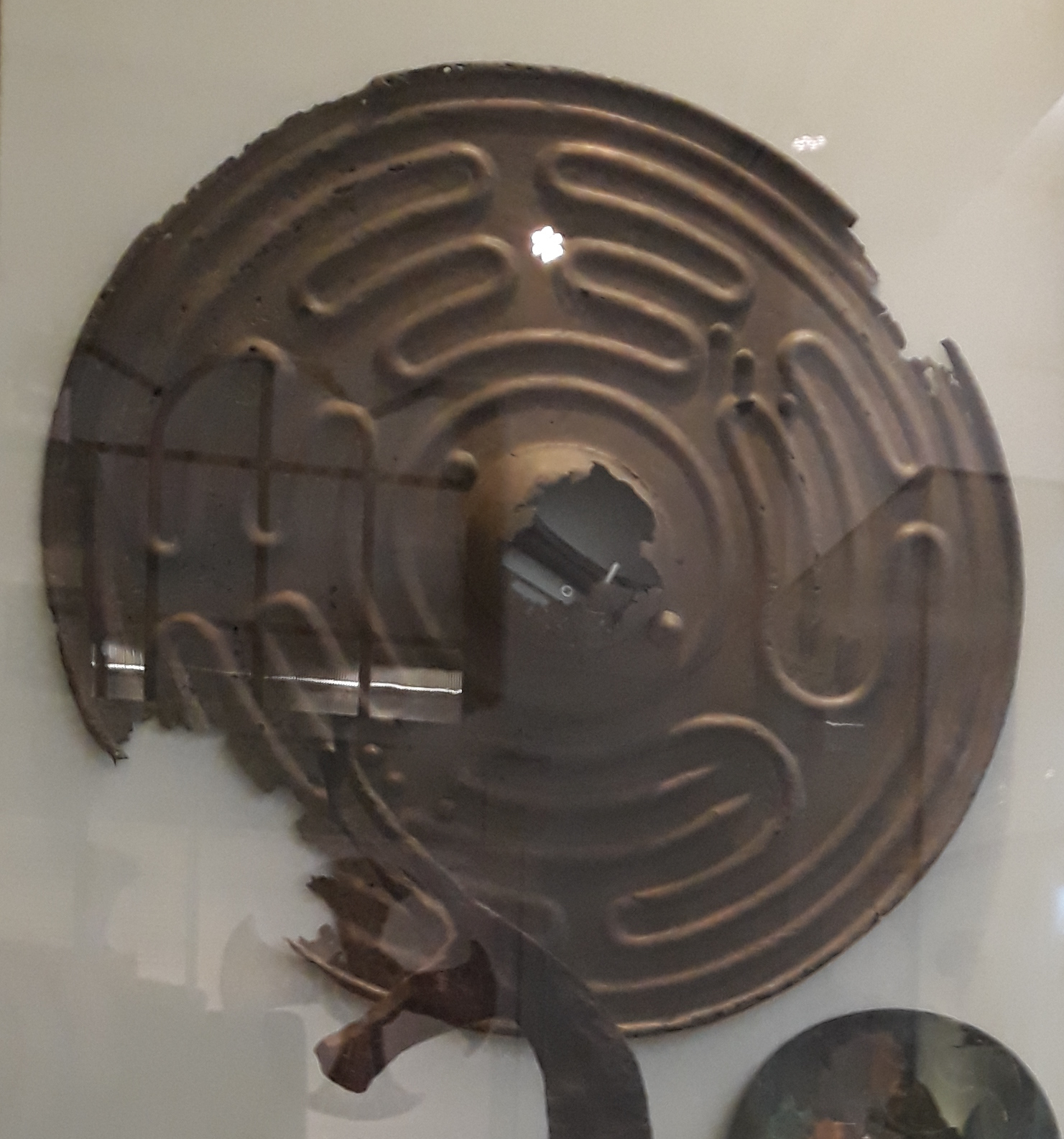
Bronze shield

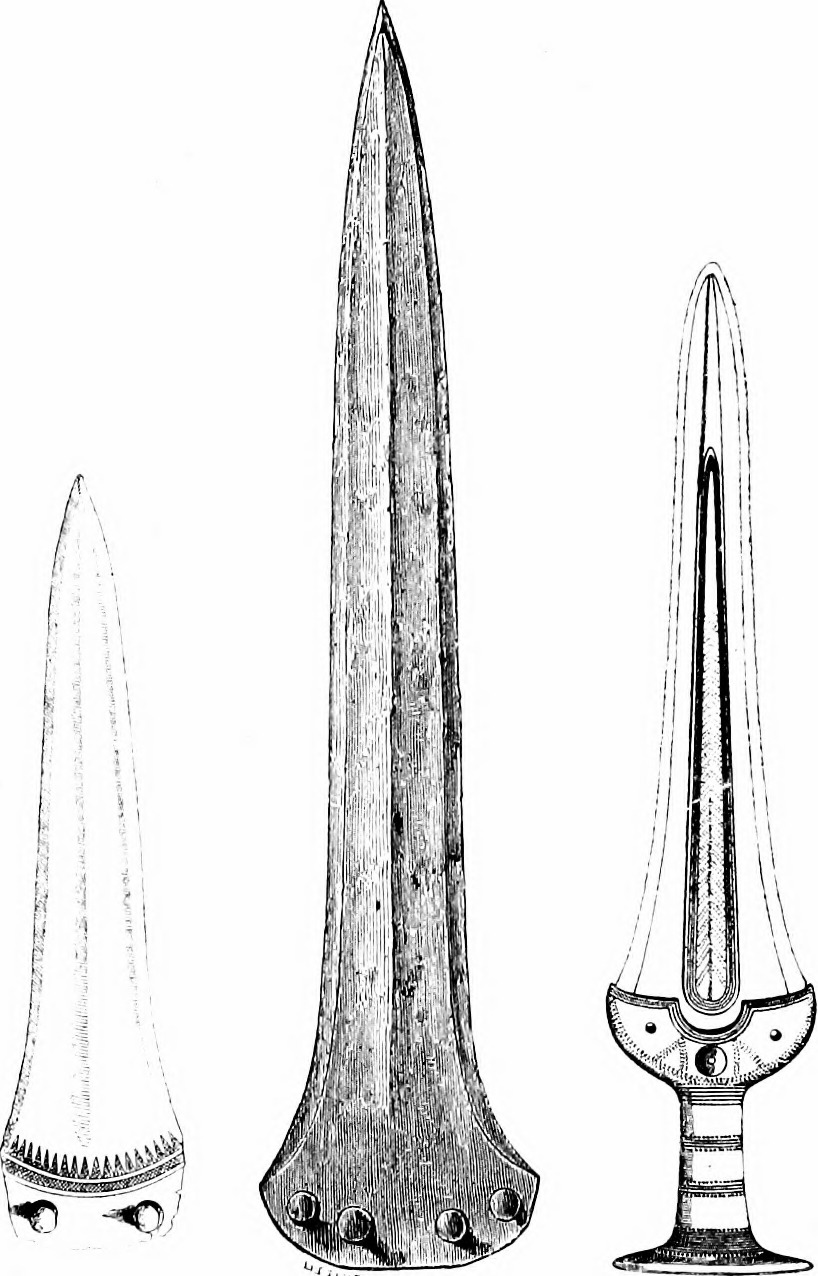
Early Bronze Age sword and daggers

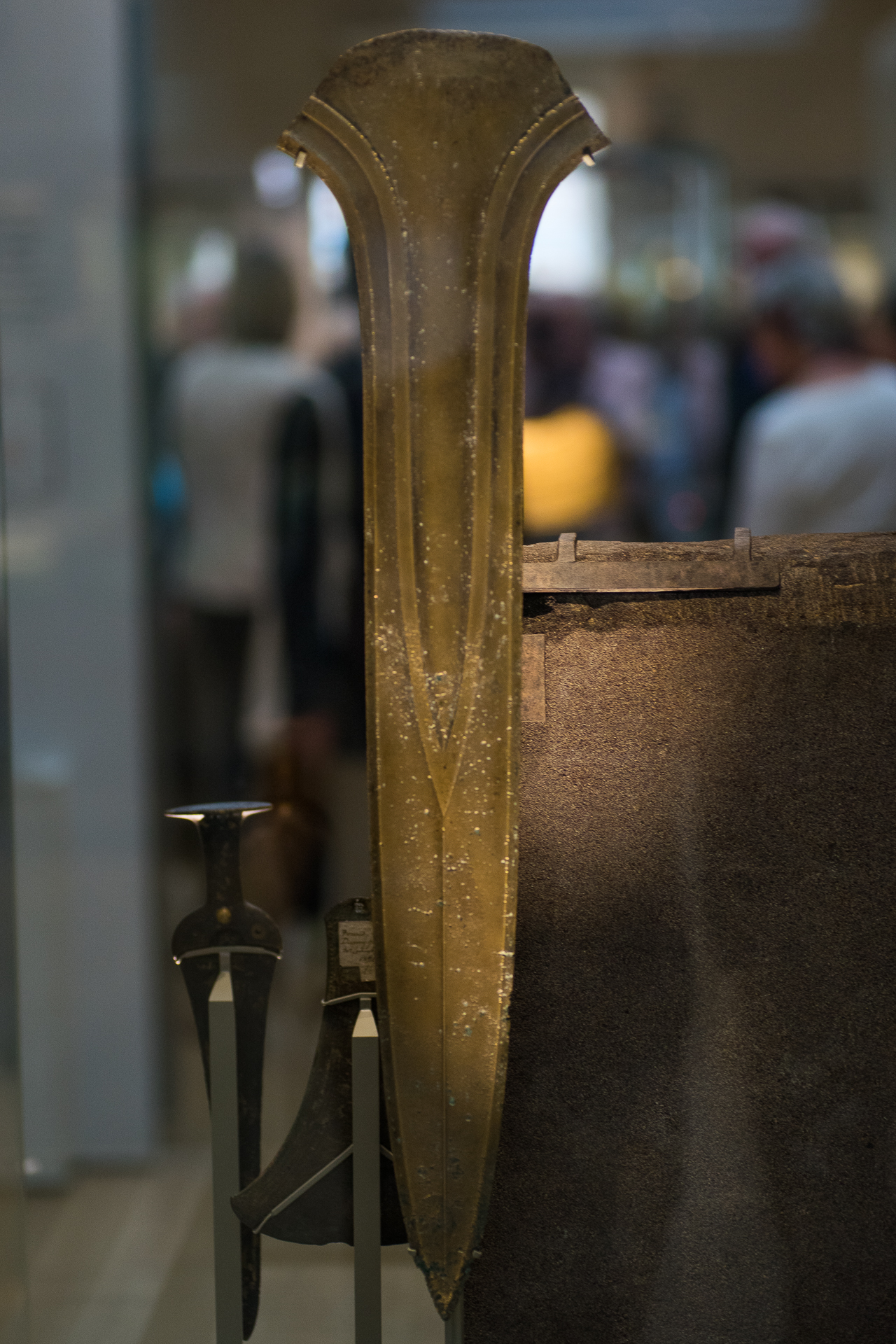
The Oxborough Dirk, 1500–1300 BC

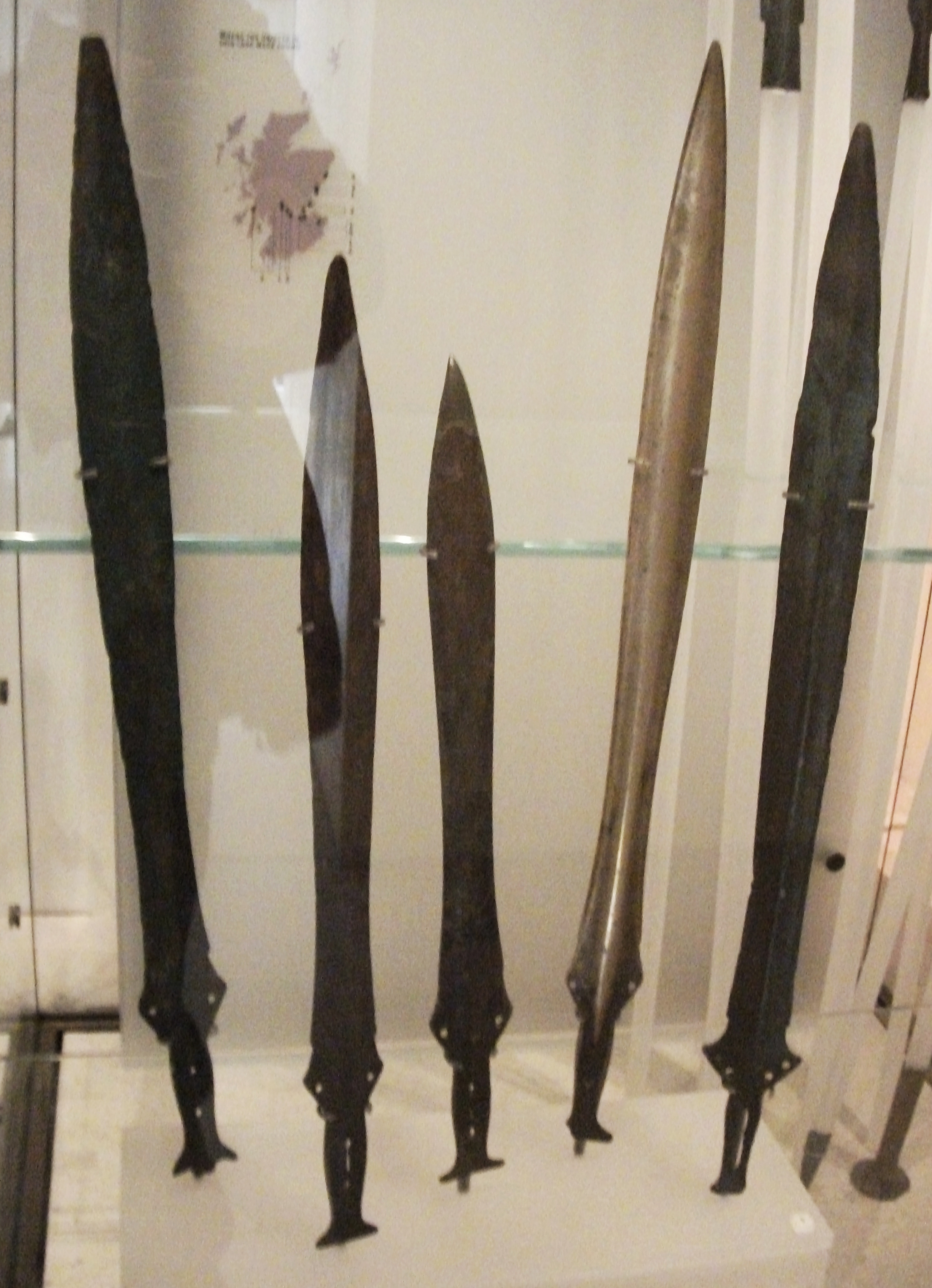
Bronze swords found in Scotland

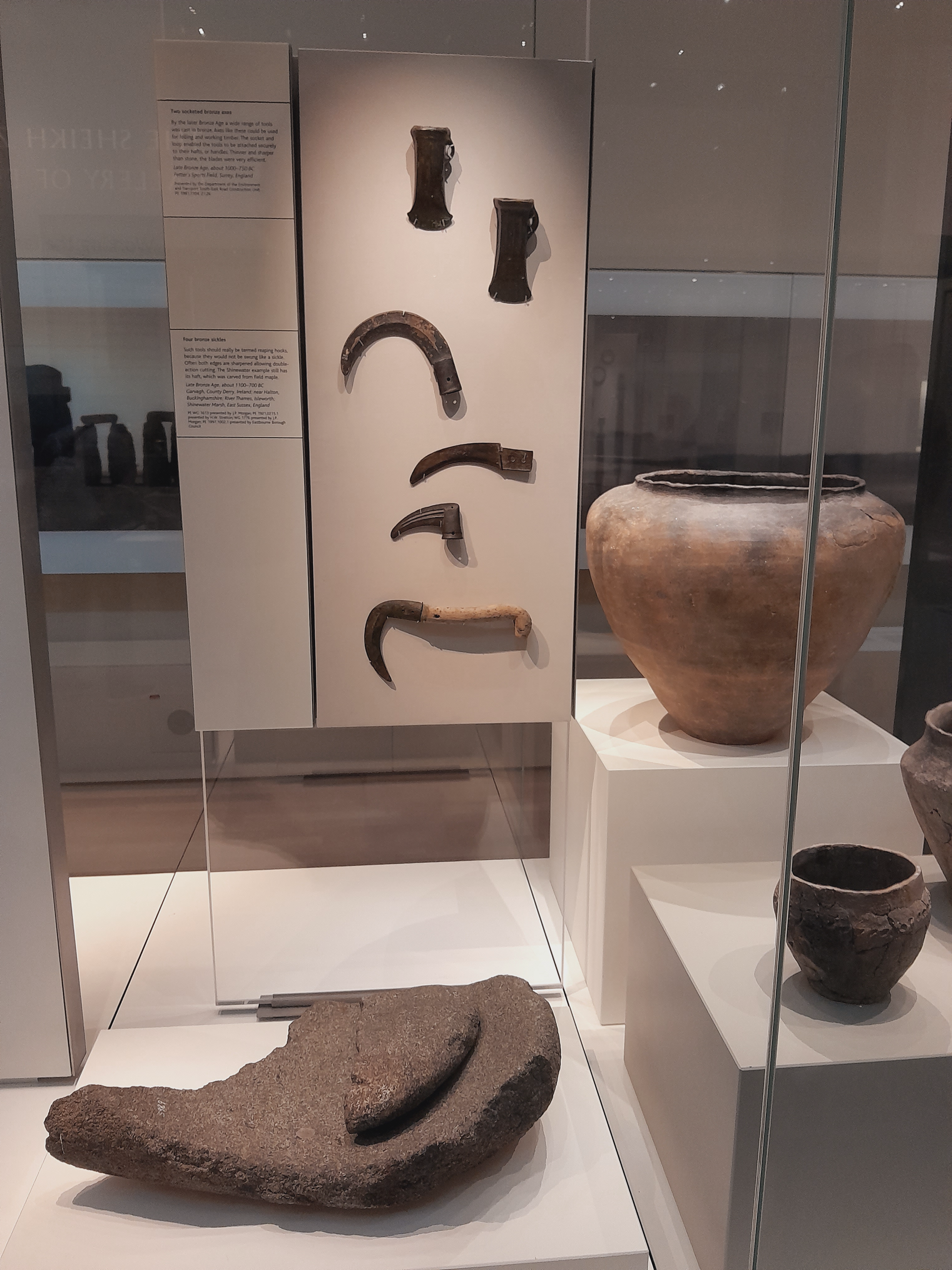
Tools and pottery

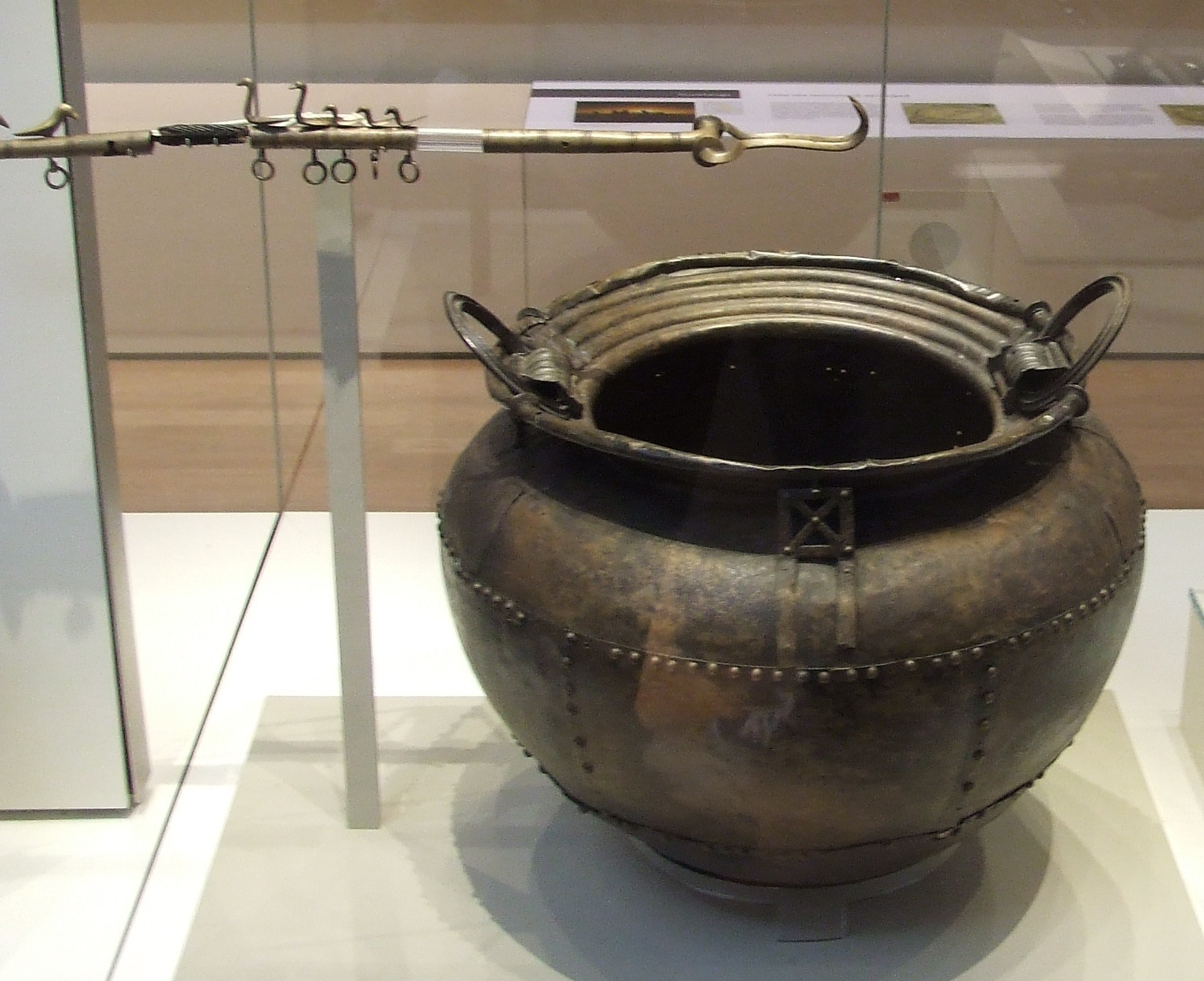
Late Bronze Age cauldron

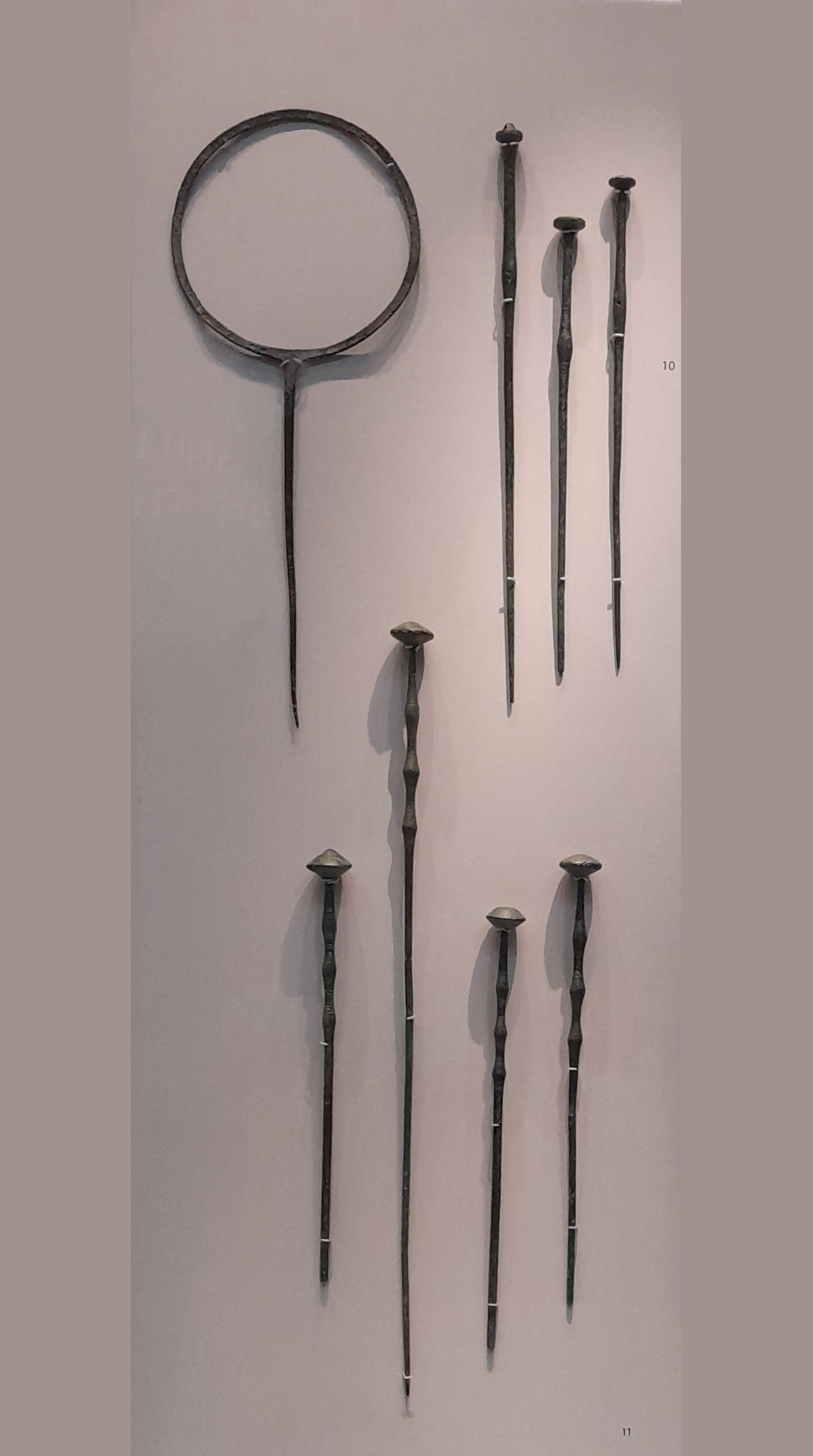
Bronze clothing pins

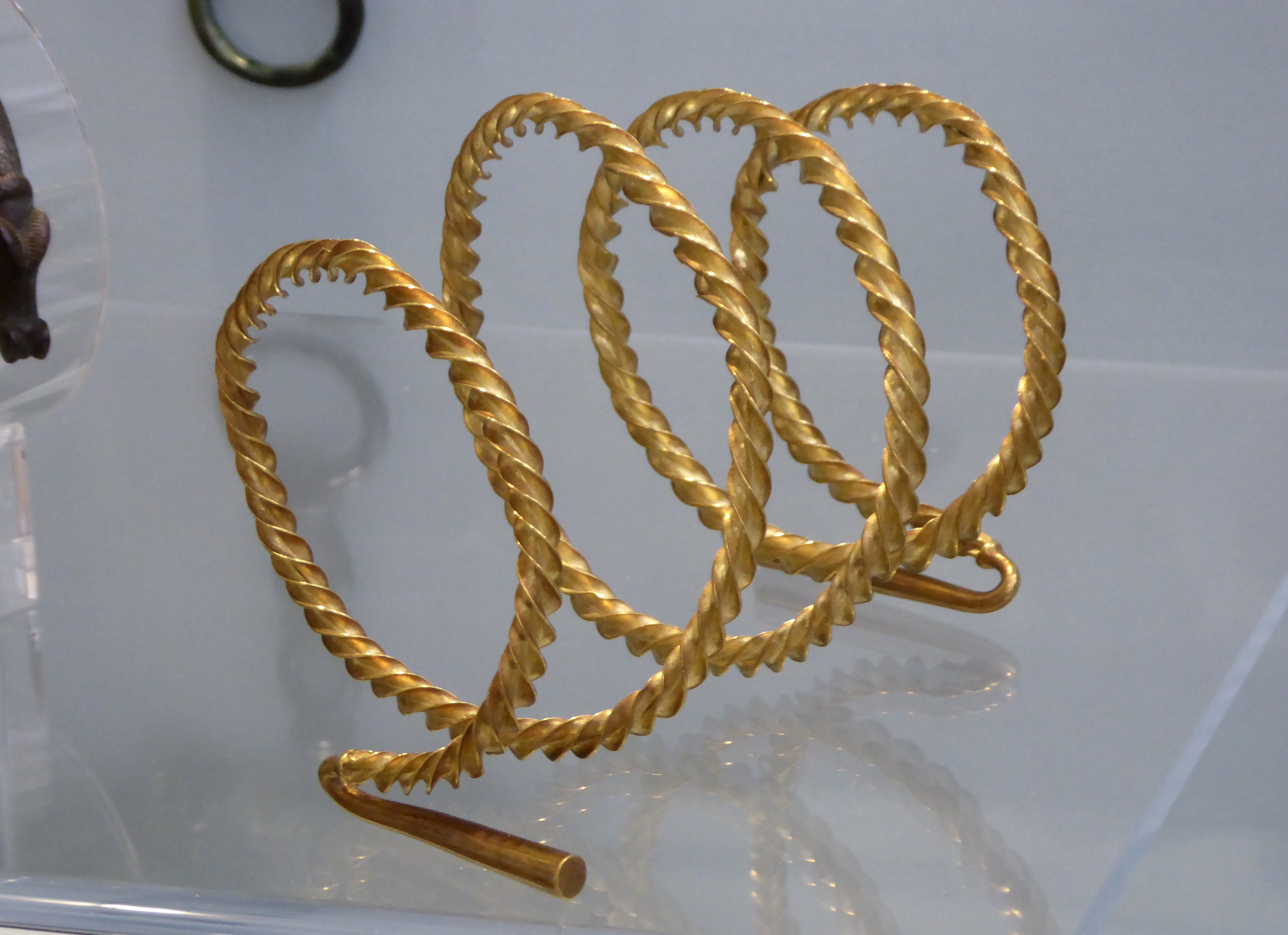
Late Bronze Age gold torque

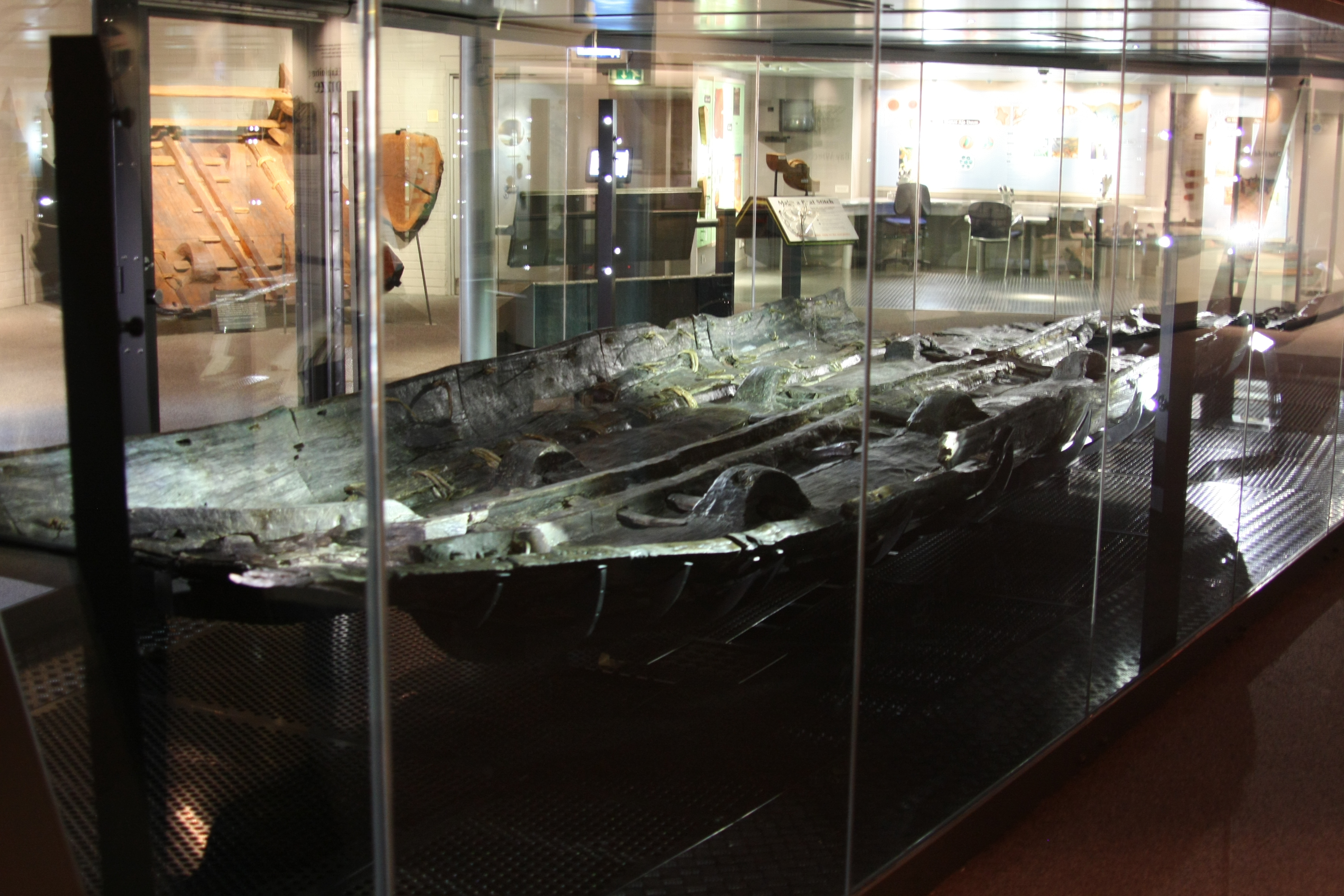
Dover Boat, c. 1500 BC

Ferriby Boat reconstruction, c. 2000 BC

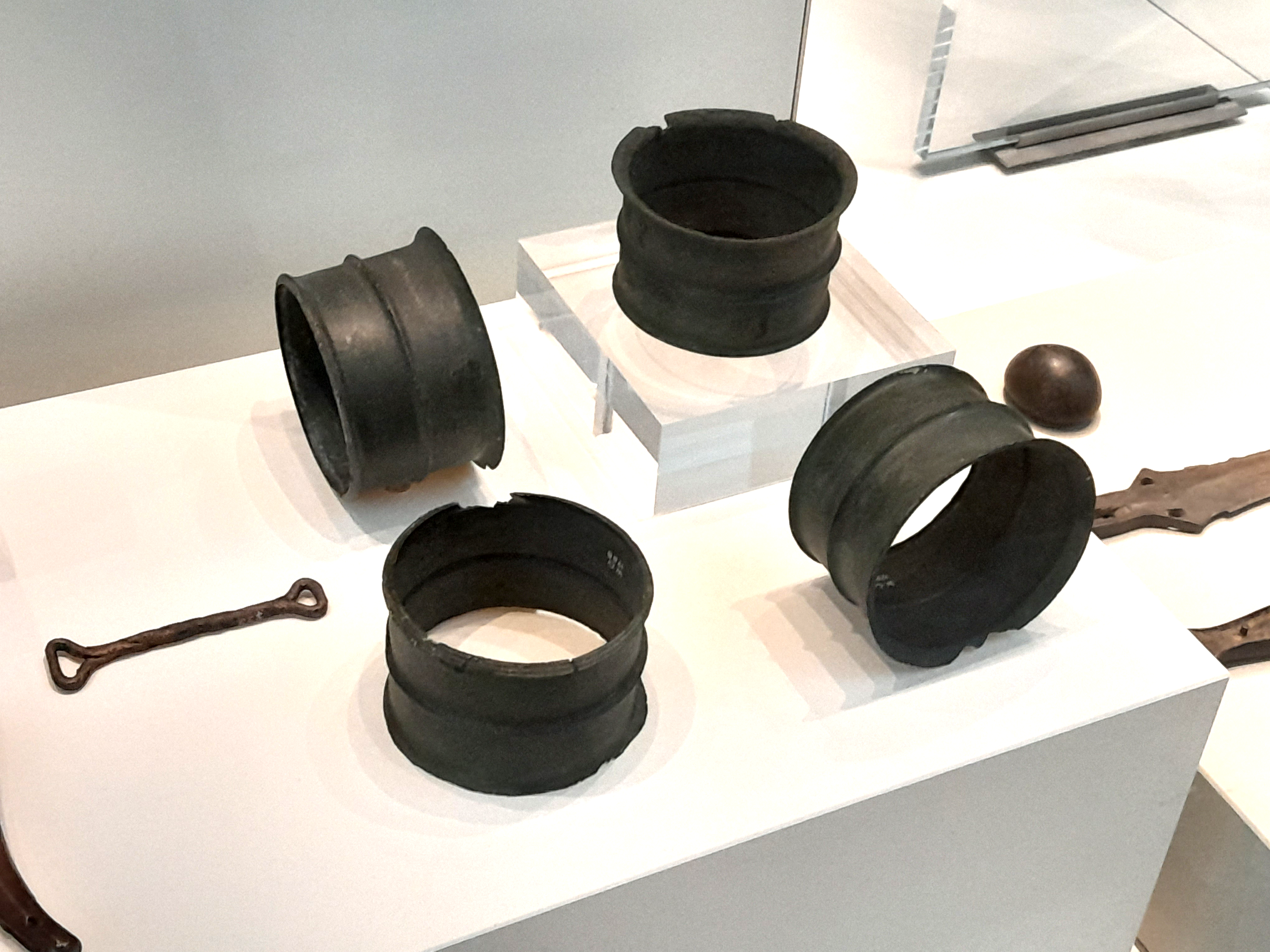
Bronze wheel parts

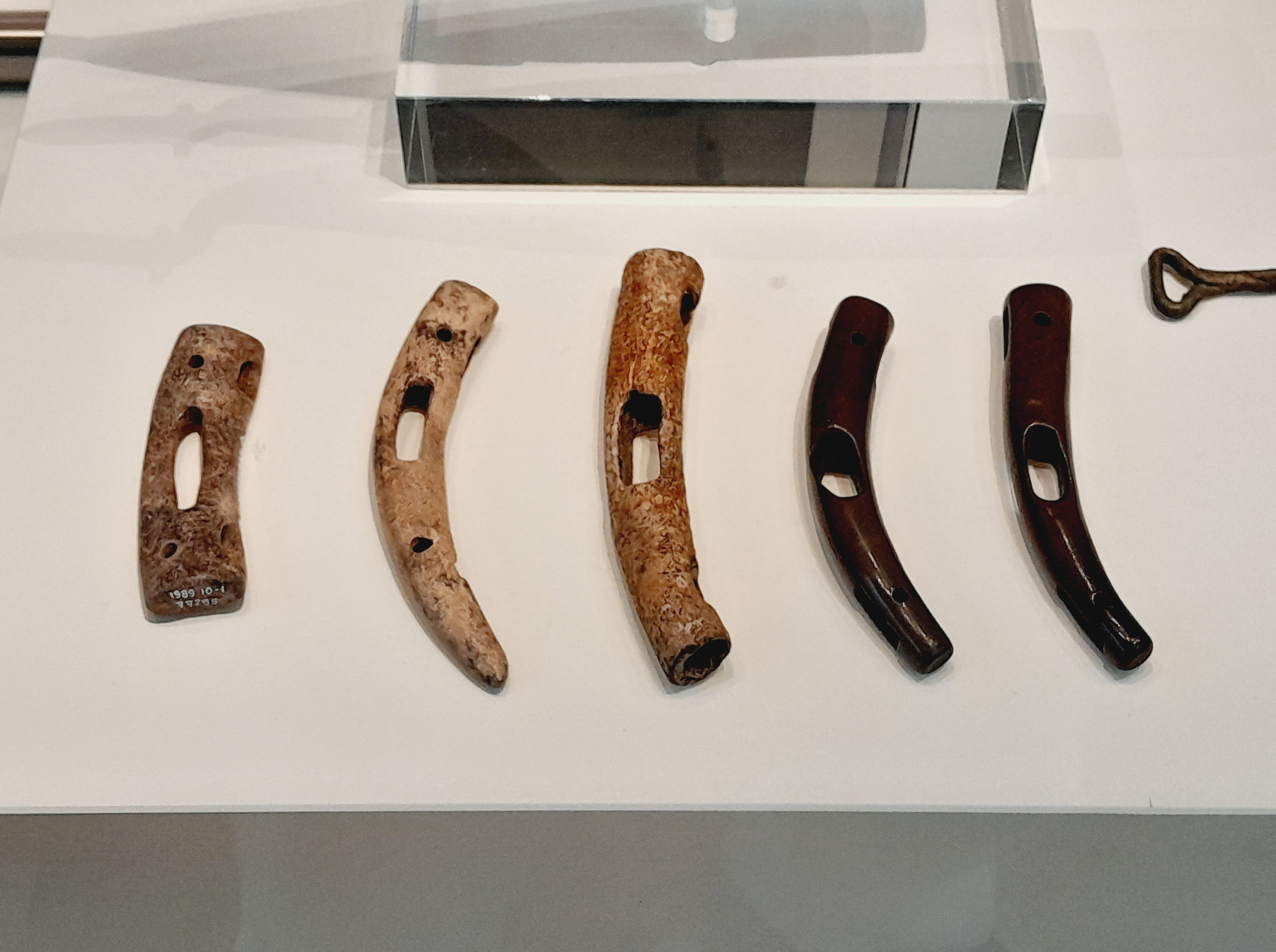
Horse bridles made from antler

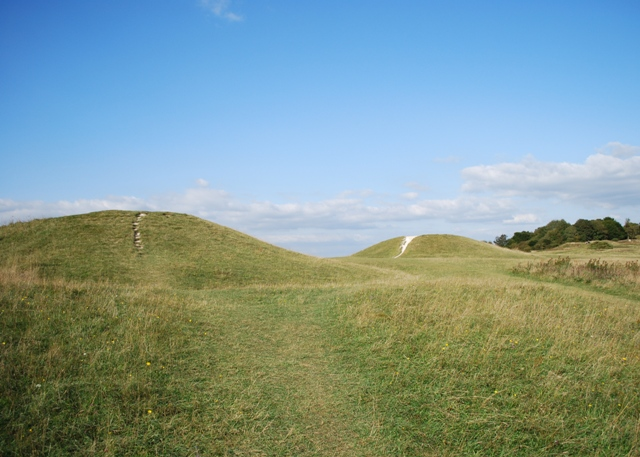
Burial mounds (barrows)

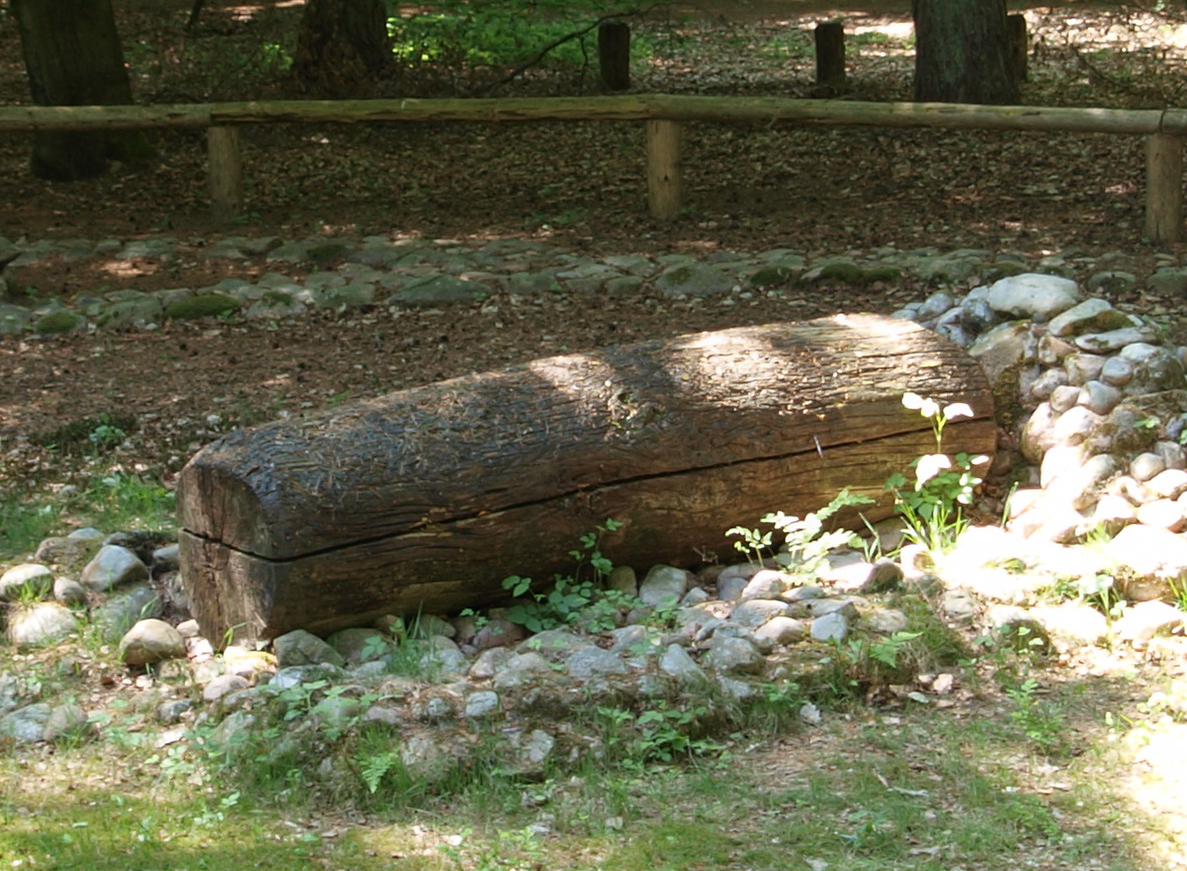
Log coffin, reconstruction

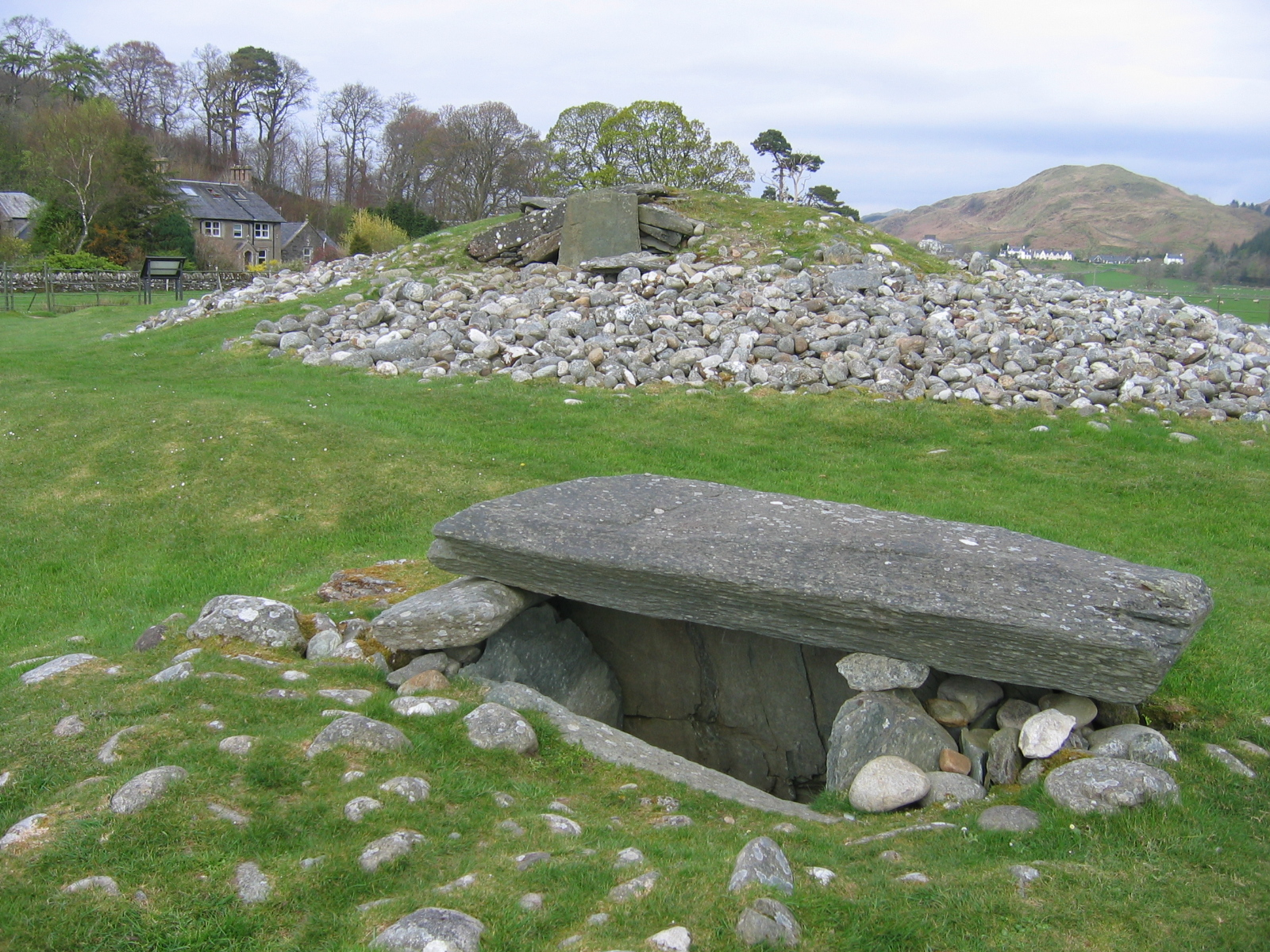
Stone cist grave, Scotland, c. 2000 BC

== See also ==
- Prehistoric Britain
- Bronze Age Scotland
- Bronze Age Cornwall
- Bronze Age Wales
- Copper and Bronze Age Ireland
- Ferriby Boats
- Langdon Bay hoard
- List of Bronze Age hoards in Great Britain
- Bronze Age France
- Unetice culture
- Armorican Tumulus culture
- Hilversum culture
- Nordic Bronze Age
- Bronze Age Europe
- Upton Lovell Shaman - one of the most important Bronze Age Britain burials
