= Knighton Heath Period =

Archaeological period in Britain

The Knighton Heath Period is the name given by Colin Burgess to a phase of the Bronze Age in Britain following the Bedd Branwen Period and spanning the period 1400 BC to 1200 BC. It was succeeded by the Penard Period.

== History ==
The Knighton Heath Period marks the end of the rich Wessex culture and the increasingly wider use of Deverel-Rimbury culture pottery. Cremation cemeteries remained the dominant burial rite and regional styles such as the Ardleigh urns of East Anglia and the Trevisker urns of Cornwall emerged.

In terms of metalworking, the period saw the end of the Acton Park phase of bronze tool manufacture and the rise of much more Continentally-influenced industries in what is called the Middle Bronze Age ornament horizon. These included the Taunton Phase in southern England, the Glentrool industries in Scotland and the Bishopsland industries in Ireland. All had links with mainland Europe, namely the Tumulus culture C stage in and the Frøjk-Osterfeld Group of Oscar Montelius' IIIb-c phase.

== Bibliography ==
- Burgess, C., 1980. The Age of Stonehenge London, Dent & Sons
- Burgess, C., 1986. 'Urnes of no Small Variety': Collared Urns Reviewed Proceedings of the Prehistoric Society 52, 339-351
