= Bedd Branwen Period =

Archaeological period in Britain

The Bedd Branwen Period is the name given by Colin Burgess to a division of the early Bronze Age in Britain covering the period between 1650 BC and 1400 BC. It follows his Overton Period and is superseded by his Knighton Heath Period.

It covers the period after the end of the Beaker tradition and the early Wessex culture, and was a time when cremation became an almost universal burial rite in Britain. Earlier round barrows were re-used for cremation cemeteries although new barrows were also still being built.

The pottery of the Deverel-Rimbury culture appears alongside the earlier collared urns in the archaeological record during this period and metalworking developed through the Arreton Down and Acton Park industries.

In his 1986 article Burgess acknowledged that the Bedd Branwen site was wrongly dated. Most of the burials actually date from a new period, the Fargo Phase c. 1800 - 1600 bc, (which used to be incorporated in the Overton Period). Burgess renamed the Bedd Branwen period the Aldbourne-Edmondsham phase.

== Bibliography ==
- Burgess, C., 1980. The Age of Stonehenge. London, Dent & Sons
- Burgess, C., 1986. 'Urnes of no Small Variety': Collared Urns Reviewed Proceedings of the Prehistoric Society 52, 339-351
