= Overton Period =

Period of British prehistory

The Overton Period is the name given by archaeologist Colin Burgess to a division of prehistory in Britain covering the period between 2000 BC and 1650 BC.

It follows the Mount Pleasant Period and precedes the Bedd Branwen Period, and is named after the typesite of the West Overton barrow cemetery in Wiltshire.

During the Overton Period the first signs of Bronze Age burial practices – urned cremations and food vessel burials – appear in the archaeological record, as well as the last stages of the use of Beaker pottery. Rich Wessex culture burials emerged during the period such as that at Bush Barrow near Stonehenge.

Characteristic metalworking types include the Amorico-British dagger and the Falkland industries, which demonstrate influences from the continental Unetice culture.
