= Ian Barnes =

Ian Barnes may refer to:

- Ian Barnes (rugby union) (born 1948), Scottish rugby union player
- Ian Barnes (biologist) (born 1972), British biologist
