= Mount Pleasant Period =

Phase of the later Neolithic in Britain

The Mount Pleasant Period is a phase of the later Neolithic in Britain dating to between c. 2750 BC and 2000 BC. It was so named by Colin Burgess in the 1970s using Mount Pleasant henge as its typesite. The period is divided into three phases, the Frankford industries, the Migdale-Marnoch industries and then the Ballyvalley-Aylesford industries. During this period, Beaker pottery appears in the archaeological record and metalworking, initially using copper and gold but with bronze working appearing at the end. It followed the Meldon Bridge Period and was superseded by the Overton Period. There are parallels with the Unetice culture of continental Europe.
