= Mount Pleasant henge =

Neolithic henge monument

Mount Pleasant Henge
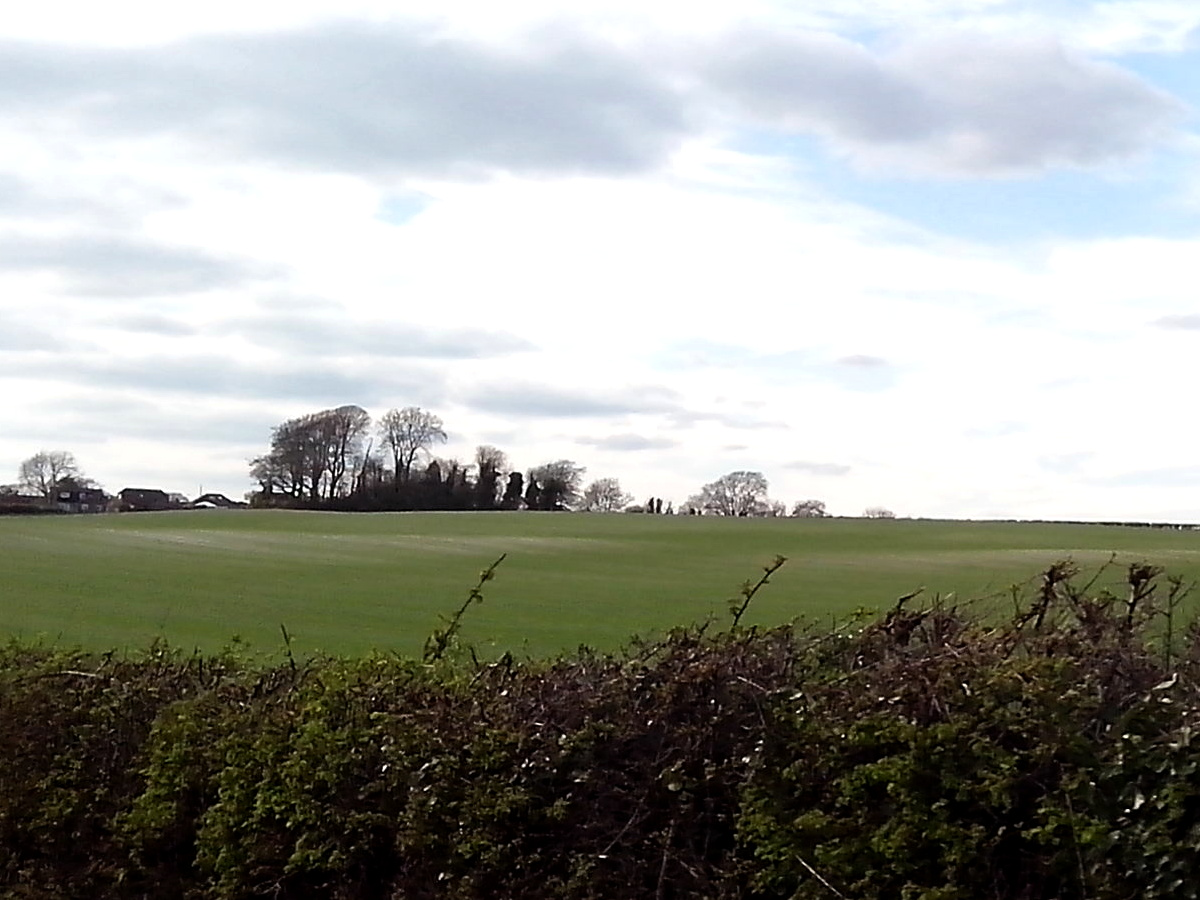
- Mount Pleasant Henge, visible as a white cropmark. Conquer Barrow is in the background

- Location within Dorset
- 50.708905°N 2.412072°W
- Type: Henge
- Periods: Neolithic
- Region: Dorset, England

Mount Pleasant henge is a Neolithic henge enclosure in the English county of Dorset. It lies southeast of Dorchester in the civil parish of West Stafford. It still partially survives as an earthwork.

== Description ==
Like other 'superhenge' sites such as Durrington Walls much of the earthworks have been ploughed or weathered away and it was not rediscovered until Stuart Piggott visited the area in 1936. On finding the site they diagnosed it as a henge as its bank was outside its ditch and a later Bronze Age barrow (known as Conquer Barrow) had been placed on top of the bank. The enclosure is egg-shaped, measuring 400 yd (370 m) along its long axis and dates to 2878–2470 cal BC.

A geophysical survey in 1969 identified entrances to the henge enclosure and a smaller inner henge enclosure at the south western end of 150 ft (46 m) diameter. Excavation in the 1960s revealed little material in the henge ditch though some fragments of grooved ware and children's skeletons were found. The inner enclosure however contained large numbers of postholes. The holes were arranged in five concentric rings with a cross-shaped layout of aisles leading into the centre. Within the aisles were further holes interpreted as being for stones. This inner feature was similar to timber circle features at The Sanctuary and Woodhenge.

A narrow, 2 m (6.6 ft) deep palisade trench was also found running around the inside of the larger henge. Consisting of large oak timbers placed at 20 in (51 cm) intervals it would have served as a huge barrier to the middle of the site. Evidence that the timber posts that had stood in the trench were burnt was also seen. The excavator, Geoffrey Wainwright, estimated that 1600 timbers had stood in the trench, enclosing an area of 12 acres (4.9 ha). Two entrances were found in the palisade, each only 3 ft (0.91 m). The timber enclosure was built around 500 years after the outer henge enclosure and caused the builders to remodel the enclosure earthworks.

The henge enclosure is the type site for the Mount Pleasant Period of the later Neolithic.

A study of the 'mega henge' has concluded that its construction was under way in around 2,500 BC, and it was built in between 35 and 125 years, not over centuries as had previously been thought.
