= Meldon Bridge Period =

The Meldon Bridge Period is the name given by archaeologists to the earliest period of metalworking and the first period of the late Neolithic in Britain. It spans the period 3000 BC to 2750 BC and is named after the typesite of Meldon Bridge in Peeblesshire. Copper was used for the first time in the British Isles, initially in Ireland and then spreading east. Metalworking phases are divided into the Stage I Castletown Roche industries and the Stage II Knocknague/Lough Ravel industries. As well as metalworking, numerous other developments appeared in the archaeological record, including henges, stone circles, Peterborough ware, Grooved ware and cursus monuments.
