= Deverel–Rimbury culture =

Archaeological culture in England

The Deverel–Rimbury culture was a name given to an archaeological culture of the British Middle Bronze Age in southern England. It is named after two barrow sites in Dorset and dates to between c. 1400 BC and 1200 BC.

== Site characteristics ==
The period is characterised by the erroneously named Celtic fields, palisaded cattle enclosures, small roundhouses and cremation burials either in urnfield cemeteries or under low, round barrows. Cremations from this period were also inserted into pre-existing barrows. The people were arable and livestock farmers.

== Pottery ==
Deverel–Rimbury pottery is characterised by distinctive globular vessels with tooled decoration and thick-walled, so-called "bucket urns" with cordoned, usually finger-printed decoration. In the southern counties of the UK, fabric is usually coarsely flint-tempered. In East Anglia and further northeast grog-tempering is typical.

== Terminology ==
The term "Deverel-Rimbury" is now mostly used to refer to the pottery types, as archaeologists today believe that Deverel–Rimbury does not represent a single homogeneous cultural group but numerous disparate groups who shared a varying range of cultural traits.
