= Ian Barnes (biologist) =

British biologist

Ian Barnes (born in Chadwell Heath in 1972) is an evolutionary geneticist notable for his work on ancient DNA, human and animal migration, and phylogenetics. Barnes is a Research Leader in the Department of Earth Sciences at the Natural History Museum in London.

He pioneered the use of ancient DNA to study the Late Pleistocene mammal fauna, which has provided insights into how animals responded to global climate change. Barnes' research also includes investigating human population change in prehistoric Britain, including work on the Mesolithic human skeleton known as Cheddar Man.

His work on phylogenetics includes a study of South American mammal species first identified by Darwin, led in collaboration with the University of York, and the American Museum of Natural History, which “resolved one of the last unresolved major problems in mammalian evolution: the origins of the South American native ungulates". He has also studied the phylogenetic placement of the Nesophontidae, and evolutionary origins of various Caribbean mammal lineages including primates and rodents.

== Education and career ==
Barnes obtained a BSc in Archaeological Sciences from the University of Bradford, and a DPhil in Biology from the University of York supervised by Keith Dobney. Following his doctoral research, Barnes worked with Mark Thomas at UCL on the recovery of DNA from medical museum specimens, and with Alan J. Cooper at the University of Oxford. He was then awarded a Wellcome Trust Bioarchaeology Fellowship and returned to UCL, and subsequently received a NERC fellowship to work on the Late Pleistocene megafauna at Royal Holloway, University of London. He was made Professor of Molecular Palaeobiology there in 2013, and moved that year to the Natural History Museum. He is the recipient of numerous research awards from major funding bodies including the Wellcome Trust and UKRI.
