= Colin Burgess (archaeologist) =

English archaeologist (1938–2014)

Colin B Burgess (1938–2014) was an archaeologist specializing in the Bronze Age, especially in the north east of England and the Mediterranean.

== Biography ==
Originally from London, Burgess studied at Cardiff University, where he wrote an undergraduate dissertation on bronze-age metalwork from the Thames.

For most of his career, he worked at Newcastle University, where he focused on the archaeology of north east of England, and formed relationships with both amateur archaeologists and international scholars.

Sometime in or after the 1980s, Burgess moved to France, having grown "disillusioned" with trends in British archaeology. (This disillusionment is expressed most forcefully in a note published in the 2001 reissue of his textbook, The Age of Stonehenge.) In this period he was particularly interested in the archaeology of Sardinia.

He returned to England for medical treatment towards the end of his life.

== Contributions ==
In the 1960s, Burgess developed a scheme for Bronze Age chronology that is still in use today.

He established the Bronze Age Studies Group, and international group of scholars that first met in 1976, and continued to meet as late as 2016.

Building on his undergraduate dissertation, his 1988 work, written with I. A. Colquhoun, The swords of Britain, catalogs over 800 examples of Bronze Age swords. Burgess and Colquhoun use methods from experimental archaeology to suggest that it took three weeks to manufacture a sword, with Bronze Age technology.

Burgess published on archaeological topics for a full five decades; his last publication appeared in 2012. For a list of publications, see the Colin B Burgess page at the Archaeology Data Service, as well as the Hommage.

== See also ==
- Carp's Tongue complex
