= List of United Kingdom bird clubs and ornithological societies =

The following is a partial list of local, county and regional bird clubs in the United Kingdom:

== Online Birding Communities ==
- chatterBirds

== England ==
- Bedfordshire Bird Club
- Bristol Ornithological Club
- Buckinghamshire Bird Club
- Cambridgeshire Bird Club
- Cheltenham Bird Club
- Cheshire and Wirral Ornithological Society
- Cornwall Birding webpage
- Cornwall Birdwatching and Preservation Society
- Cumbria Bird Club
- Devon Birdwatching and Preservation Society
- Dorset Bird Club
- Durham Bird Club
- Fylde Bird Club
- Hampshire Ornithological Society
- Isles of Scilly Bird Group
- Kent Ornithological Society
- Leicestershire & Rutland Ornithological Society
- Lincolnshire Bird Club
- Burbage Bird Club Leicestershire
- Norfolk Bird Club
- Nottinghamshire Birdwatchers
- Oxford Ornithological Society
- Shropshire Ornithological Society
- Somerset Ornithological Society
- Surrey Bird Club
- Sussex Ornithological Society
- West Midland Bird Club (covers Staffordshire, Warwickshire, Worcestershire and, since its inception in 1974, the West Midlands county)
- Wiltshire Ornithological Society

== Scotland ==
- Scottish Ornithologists' Club

== Wales ==
- Cambrian Ornithological Society
- Carmarthenshire Bird Club
- Glamorgan Bird Club
- Gower Ornithological Society
- Gwent Ornithological Society
- Welsh Ornithological Society

== Northern Ireland ==
- Northern Ireland Ornithological Club
