= The Lords of Afan =

The Lords of Afan ruled over an area between the rivers Afan and Neath in Glamorgan between c. 1100 and the latter half of the 14th century.

In 1091 the Normans took control of Glamorgan from its former ruler Iestyn ap Gwrgant. His son Caradog ab Iestyn retained control over part of the lands in the area of the Afan valley. He built a castle at Aberavon and he and his descendants became known as the 'Lords of Afan'. There were 10 lords overall. Over time they became more Norman than Welsh. When the 6th lord, Morgan Fychan, died in 1288 he was known as the Lord of Avene. However, his son Leisan became the first be known by the Norman-style surname "D'Avene" and he named his sons John and Thomas. By 1373 the lords had gone and the land was now under the control of Edward le Despencer, Lord of Glamorgan. Today one of the pubs of Port Talbot is named "The Lord Caradoc" in memory of the first of the Lords of Afan.
