= Iestyn ap Gwrgant =

Last independent ruler of Morgannwg (1014–1093)

- Coat of arms
- Reign: 1081–1093
- Coronation: 1081
- Predecessor: Caradog ap Gruffudd
- Successor: Monarchy abolished Robert Fitzhamon (as the Norman Lord of Glamorgan)
- Born: 1014; Morgannwg, Wales
- Died: 1093 (aged 78–79); Rhiwbina, Glamorgan, Wales
- Consort: Constance ferch Cadwgon
- Wife: Denis ferch Bleddyn
- Issue: Catrin ferch Iestyn; Madog ap Iestyn; Caradog ap Iestyn; Rhys ap Iestyn; Nest ferch Iestyn; Gwenllian ferch Iestyn
- Welsh: Brythonic Branch
- House: Morgannwg
- Father: Gwrgant ab Ithel
- Mother: MissVerch Gwerystan

Iestyn ap Gwrgant ([ˈjɛstɪn ap ˈgʊrgant], English: Iestyn, son of Gwrgant; 1014–1093), or Jestyn ap Gwrgant, was the last ruler of the Welsh kingdom of Morgannwg, which encompassed the counties of Glamorgan and Monmouthshire.

== Lineage ==
Iestyn ap Gwrgant was the last ruler of the royal house of Morgannwg, which had a lineage stretching back over five centuries to Tewdrig (c. 500–520). The members of this royal house had links to the other royal houses of Wales through marriage, and were descendants of the celebrated Rhodri Mawr. Iestyn ap Gwrgant's base is believed to have been at Dinas Powys, south west of Cardiff.

== Norman invasion ==
Iestyn probably ruled Morgannwg for a little less than a decade (c. 1081–1090) and is believed to have built castles in the regions of Cardiff and Kenfig. The popular version of historical events is that Iestyn, following a dispute with his rival Einion ap Collwyn, invited Robert Fitzhamon and his twelve knights into the region to settle the matter. Once invited in, they refused to leave. He was deposed c. 1090 by Norman ruler Robert Fitzhamon, lord of Gloucester, who established a lordship based in Cardiff and subsequently conquered the lowlands of Glamorgan (the Vale of Glamorgan), which was parcelled out to his followers. The mountainous parts of Glamorgan were left in Welsh control. Caradog ap Iestyn, the eldest son of Iestyn ap Gwrgant, was the only Welsh lord to retain lands in the Glamorgan lowlands after Fitzhamon had conquered them. He retained the land between the River Neath and the River Afan, and he and his descendants were known as the "lords of Afan." His descendants are thought to include the Williams family of Aberpergwm and the Powell Wilkins family of Carreg Cennen, Carmarthenshire.

== Modern interpretation ==
Flag of Cardiff

Iestyn ap Gwrgant's arms can be seen today in a modern context as a banner of the arms forms the Flag of Glamorgan which itself forms a charge on the flag of Cardiff. Additionally the arms are found within the crest of Pontypridd Rugby Football Club, a Rugby Union team from Pontypridd within the ancient boundaries of Morgannwg. Richard Williams Morgan claimed that a reference to a son of Caratacus called Saint Cyllin was found in the family records of Iestyn ab Gwrgant and used this as evidence of early entry of Christianity to Britain "Cyllin ab Caradog, a wise and just king. In his days many of the Cymry embraced the faith in Christ through the teaching of the saints of Cor-Eurgain, and many godly men from the countries of Greece and Rome were in Cambria. He first of the Cymry gave infants names; for before, names were not given except to adults, and then from something characteristic in their bodies, minds, or manners."

Regnal titles
Preceded by Caradog ap Gruffudd	King of Morgannwg; 1081 – c. 1090	Succeeded by Abolished
