= Wilburton-Wallington Phase =

Archaeological period in Britain

The Wilburton-Wallington Phase is the name given by archaeologists to a metalworking stage of the Bronze Age in Britain spanning the period between c. 1140 BCE and c. 1020 BCE.

The Wilburton complex was present in Southern Britain and the Wallington (Northumberland) complex in the north. Both are characterised by the introduction of copper-lead-tin alloys in bronze making and by the manufacture of leaf-shaped slashing swords, socketed spearheads secured to a shaft with a peg, horse-bits and socketed axes.

It is paralleled by the Poldar industries in Scotland and the Roscommon industries in Ireland as well as being linked with the Urnfield culture A2-B1 in South Germany.

It is preceded in Britain by the Penard Period, and followed by the Ewart Park Phase/ Blackmoor Period.

== Bibliography ==
- Needham, S., Bronk Ramsey, C., Coombs, D., Cartwright, C., and Pettitt, P., (1997) "An independent chronology for British Bronze Age metalwork: the results of the Oxford Radiocarbon Accelerator Programme", Archaeological Journal, Volume 154, pp. 55–107.
