= Llyn Fawr Phase =

Archaeological period in Britain

The Llyn Fawr Phase is the name given by archaeologists to the final metalworking phase of the Bronze Age in Britain, dating to between c. 800 BC and c. 700BC, when the transition to the Iron Age was underway.

It is named after a hoard of metalwork found in Llyn Fawr in Glamorgan between 1911 and 1913. Bronze and iron co-existed although the latter was more limited to cutting implements whilst bronze was used for both weapons (Sompting axes) and other items such as cauldrons, razors, horse harness mounts and winged chapes.

Imports of Gündlingen swords from the Continental Hallstatt culture C phase influenced local styles such as the Thames sword.

It is preceded by the Ewart Park Phase.
