= Glamorgan Bird Club =

Welsh organisation

- Founded: 1989
- Type: Charitable Incorporated Organisation number 1177991
- Purpose: birdwatching, surveys, conservation, ringing projects, publishing papers and articles
- Location: Cardiff
- Region served: Glamorgan
- Method: education, field trips, indoor meetings
- Members: 300
- Website: www.GlamorganBirds.org.uk

Glamorgan Bird Club is based in Glamorgan in South Wales, and is dedicated to the study and conservation of the avifauna of Eastern Glamorgan which is the club's bird 'recording area'. This comprises the Counties of Caerphilly (west of the Rhymney River), Merthyr Tydfil, Cardiff, Rhondda Cynon Taf, Vale of Glamorgan, and Bridgend).

== Foundation ==
The club was originally formed in 1989 as 'The Glamorgan Bird Club' but is now known simply as 'Glamorgan Bird Club'.

In 2009, the club became a Registered Charity (No. 1129684) but in March 3018 it changed its status from a Registered Charity to a Charitable Incorporated Organisation (CIO) (No. 1177991)

== Logo ==
The club's original crest was a little whimbrel (Numenius minutus), which marked the discovery of that species at Sker Point in 1982. This was the first record for this species in the United Kingdom, and the second in the Western Palearctic (the first had been in Norway in 1969).

Glamorgan Bird Club logo (used until 2018)

However, since the club's conversion in March 2018, from a Registered Charity to a Charitable Incorporated Organisation, the crest now depicts a Northern Wheatear (Oenanthe oenanthe). In view of the significant change of status and name it was decided that some kind of 're-branding' was required to mark the change and distinguish the old club from the new club, hence the new, more modern logo. The (Northern) Wheatear was decided upon as it is a familiar migratory species which is found along the coast of Glamorgan during spring and autumn migration and breeds in the county's uplands

== Membership and events ==
Membership ranges from beginners and back-garden birdwatchers to those who are professionally involved in conservation. Its common interest is the enjoyment of birds.

A full programme of events is run annually, with indoor meetings from October to April on a wide range of subjects, and field trips led by experienced birdwatchers to a number of locations both locally and further afield. The club also holds a monthly public walk at Kenfig National Nature Reserve, especially aimed at beginners, in partnership with the Reserve.

The Club has an average annual membership of c.300, and Club members receive a quarterly newsletter, containing up-to-date news and information. Each year a comprehensive report, free to members, on the status of birds in the 'recording area' is published. Birdwatchers throughout the area submit reports to the County Recorder. Over time, an invaluable database of the region's bird life is accumulating.

== Publications ==
The club produces publications from time to time, including "Birding in Glamorgan" (2009), a guide to over 50 of the best places in Glamorgan for bird-watching, and also sponsored and published "The Birds of Cardiff" - D.Gilmore (2006), an informative book listing all the species ever recorded in Cardiff Unitary Authority.

In association with the Gower Ornithological Society, it runs a website, which includes a sightings page. The Club also has a Facebook page, and is on Twitter..
