= Ewart Park Phase =

The Ewart Park Phase is a period of the later Bronze Age Britain.

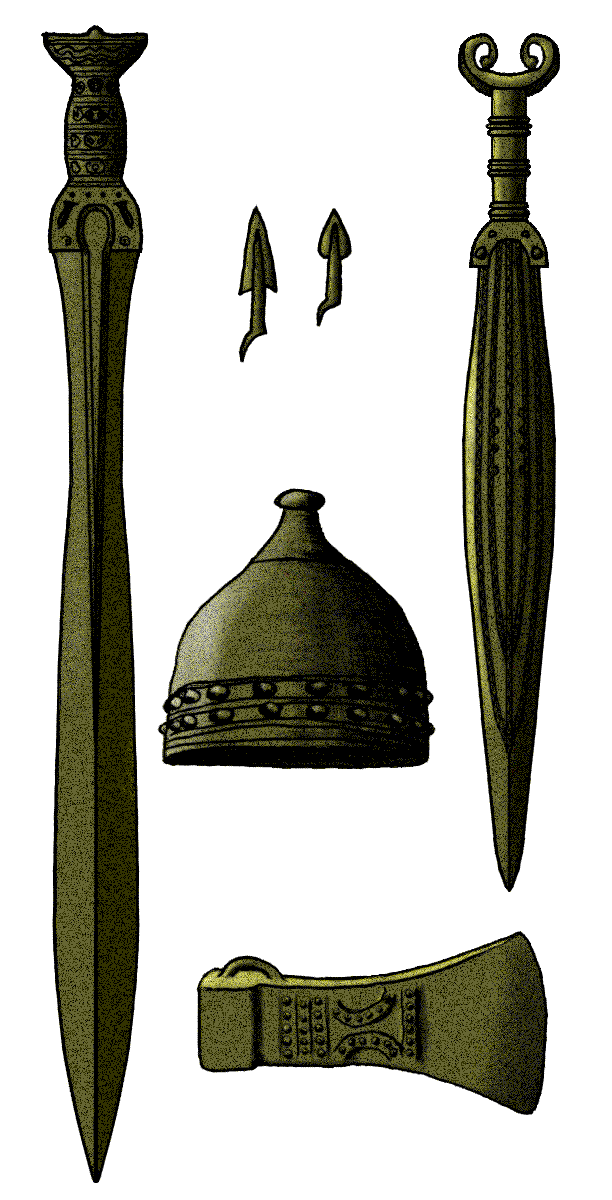
Samples of weapons

It is named after a founder's hoard discovered in Ewart Park in Northumberland and is the twelfth in a sequence of industrial stages that cover the period 3000 BC to 600 BC.

The Ewart Park phase dates from 800 to 700 BC, preceded by the Wilburton complex in the south and the Wallington complex and Poldar phase in the north. There are several regional sub groups including the Carp's Tongue complex in the south east, the Llantwit-Stogursey tradition in south Wales, the Broadward complex in the Welsh Marches, the Heathery Burn tradition in the north and the Scottish Duddington, Covesea, and Ballimore traditions. The Irish parallel is the Dowris Phase.

Alloying metal with lead became a common practice during the period and numerous hoards date to this period. In common with the continental Hallstatt culture, horse harnesses and vehicle fittings were developed and links with the late Urnfield culture and Hallstatt early C are apparent.

Recently, the Ewart Park Phase, and related Atlantic phases, have come to be seen as the probable point of origin of some developments in metalwork, that then spread widely across inland continental Europe. This reverses the previously assumed direction of travel. The types concerned include swords, winged chapes and buckets.

== Ewart Park Sword ==
According to the Portable Antiquities Scheme:

"Most Bronze Age swords in museum collections in Britain come from the Ewart Park Phase. Generally these swords have a bulging shape in the blade at the midway point before narrowing towards the shoulders and the terminal which is fan shaped. Size and number of rivets vary greatly. These swords developed from the Wilburton swords with little influence from the continent and it appears they first occurred in Northern Britain."

The Ewart Park phase was succeeded by the Llyn Fawr Phase which is parallel to Hallstatt C proper.
