= Penard Period =

Ancient period of metalworking technology in Britain

The Penard Period is a metalworking phase of the Bronze Age in Britain spanning the period c. 1275 BC to c. 1140 BC.

It is named after the typesite of Penard in West Glamorgan, where a hoard of bronze tools from the period was found in 1827.

The period is characterised by a flowering in experimentation in bronze working, spurred by increased contact with the Urnfield culture of Continental Europe from where early sword and shield imports came.

Chronologically it follows the Taunton Period metalworking phase, and precedes the Wilburton-Wallington Phase. There are links with Reinecke D and early Hallstatt A1 periods, and the French Rosnoën and the Montelius III phases.

Developments included the invention of the cylinder sickle and leaf-shaped pegged spearheads, mirroring an increase in the use of sheet bronze. Clay moulds and new lead-rich alloys were also employed.

== Bibliography ==
- Needham, S.; Bronk Ramsey, C.; Coombs, D.; Cartwright, C.; Pettitt, P. (1997). "An independent chronology for British Bronze Age metalwork: the results of the Oxford Radiocarbon Accelerator Programme". Archaeological Journal. 154: 55–107.
