= Carp's Tongue complex =

Bronze Age metalworking period in England

In archaeology, the Carp's Tongue complex refers to a tradition of metal working from south eastern England in the later Bronze Age. It is part of the Ewart Park Phase that dates from the ninth century BC.

== Archaeological findings ==
Numerous distinctive metal items have been found in founder's hoards from the Thames valley and Kent that differ from items found elsewhere in Britain. Related items have been found in Ireland and in France. The period was one where experiments in alloying lead with bronze were being used to develop new artefact types, some of which have an uncertain purpose. The complex is named after the carp's tongue sword but other objects include triangular perforated knives, hog's back knives, socketed and end-winged axes, and mysterious bugle-shaped objects.

== Interpretation ==
Quite why so much experimentation was taking place at a time when iron was increasingly supplanting bronze as the material of choice is uncertain. Colin Burgess has argued that new techniques triggered a kind of industrial revolution, others that there was an oversupply of bronze that smiths were obliged to find something to do with.
