= Flag of Glamorgan =

Historic Welsh county flag

Glamorgan
- Proportion: 3:5
- Adopted: 24 September 2013
- Design: Gules three Chevronels Argent

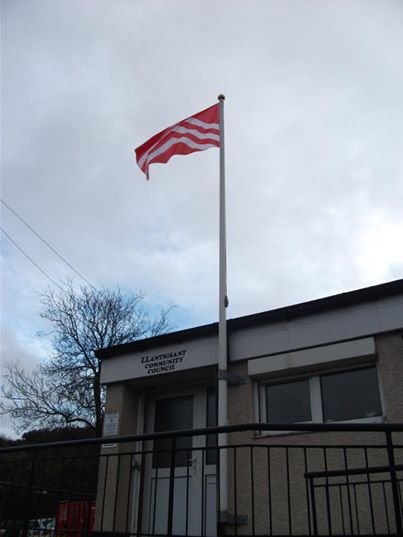
The flag of Glamorgan flies over the offices of Llantrisant Community Council in the county.

The Glamorgan flag (Welsh: Baner Morgannwg) is the flag of the county of Glamorgan. It was registered with the Flag Institute on 24 September 2013.

== Design ==
The flag is a banner of the arms of Iestyn ap Gwrgant, the last ruler of the Kingdom of Morgannwg, the predecessor of the county of Glamorgan. The design of three silver chevrons on a red field features in the coats of arms of many of the councils in the area, including those of the Vale of Glamorgan and of former Mid, South and West Glamorgan. It also features on the flag of Cardiff where a dragon is holding the banner aloft symbolising Cardiff's status as county town of Glamorgan.

=== Colours ===
The Pantone colours for the flag are:

Scheme	Red	White
Pantone (paper)	186 C	Safe
HEX	#C8102E	#FFFFFF
CMYK	0, 100, 80, 5	0, 0, 0, 0
RGB	200, 16, 46	255, 255, 255

== History ==
=== Origin and evolution ===
The flag is a banner of the arms which were, centuries after the fact, attributed to Iestyn ap Gwrgant, the last independent ruler of the Kingdom of Morgannwg, which is today Glamorgan. Though the arms' origin beyond that is unclear, they are widely believed to be based on the arms of the de Clare family, a prominent Anglo-Norman noble family, notably the Norman Lords of Glamorgan. The de Clare arms have a similar design of simply three chevrons, though they are red and the field is yellow. John Speed's 1611 map of Glamorgan uses a coat of arms with a familiar red field but gold chevrons to symbolise Cardiff. The chevrons, accompanied by a book of bound Argent the dexter page charged with a crescent and the sinister with an embattled Annulet both Gules all within a bordure Argent, are today used as the arms of Cardiff University.

The first time the arms were used as such was on a seal by Lleision d’Avene, Gwrgant's great-great-great-grandson. According to documents from the time, the ruined Margam Abbey in Neath Port Talbot allegedly had the arms in its stonework. The arms continued to be heavily associated with the county through to the 19th century, when the company responsible for the Rhymney Railway began using the arms in their badge. (Cardiff Railway also used it in their logo.)

=== Modern use ===
Cardiff was awarded arms whose shield featured a dragon holding the chevron flag in 1906, a precedent set by the arms of several other local council authorities. Philip Tibbetts, a vexillologist who conducted the competitions that selected the flags for Aberdeenshire, Banffshire, Berwickshire, Caithness East Lothian, Moray, Sutherland, Tiree, Skye and Maryhill, proposed the arms as a flag for the county. Local historical societies supported his bid, and the flag was registered by the Flag Institute in 2013.

== Gallery ==
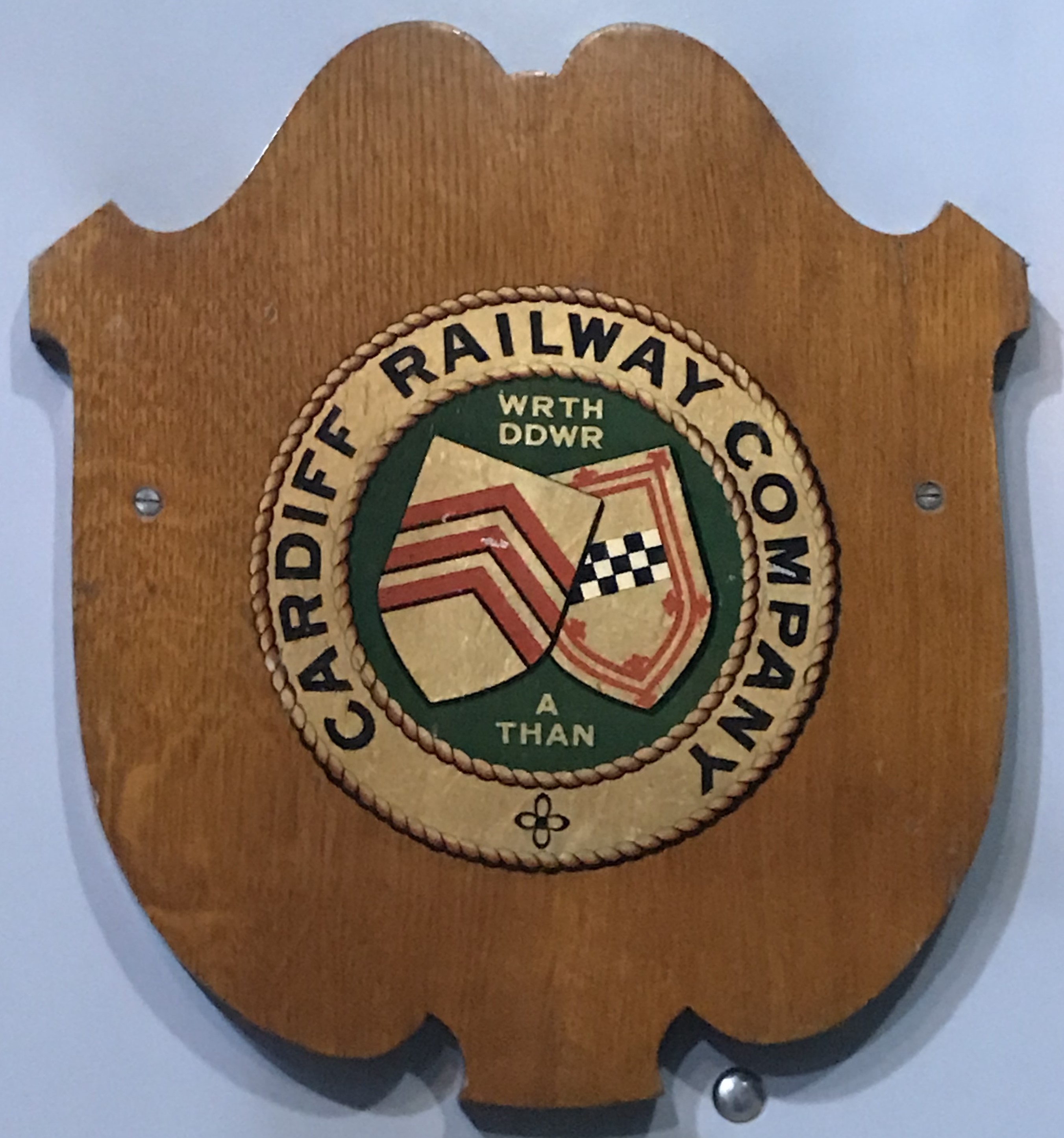
Logo of Cardiff Railway, with the chevron arms.

The flag of Cardiff
