= Glamorgan =

Historic county of Wales

Coordinates: 51°40′N 3°40′W

Glamorgan Morgannwg (Welsh)
- Historic county
- 1536–1974
- Flag adopted in 2013

- Area
  - 1861: 547,494 acres (2,215.63 km^{2})
  - 1911: 518,865 acres (2,099.77 km^{2})
  - 1961: 523,253 acres (2,117.53 km^{2})
- Population
  - 1861: 326,254
  - 1911: 1,120,910
  - 1961: 1,229,728
- Density
  - 1861: 0.7/acre
  - 1911: 2.2/acre
  - 1961: 2.4/acre
- Status: Non-administrative county (1536–1889); Administrative county (1889–1974); Historic county (non-administrative)
- Chapman code: GLA
- Government: Glamorgan County Council (1889–1974)
  - HQ: Cardiff
  - Motto: A ddioddefws a orfu (lit. 'He who suffered, conquered')
- History
  - Established: 1536
  - Council established: 1889
  - Disestablished: 1974
Preceded by
Lordship of Glamorgan
Succeeded by
Mid Glamorgan
South Glamorgan
West Glamorgan

Glamorgan (/ɡləˈmɔːrɡən/), or sometimes Glamorganshire (Welsh: Morgannwg [mɔrˈɡanʊɡ] or Sir Forgannwg [ˈsiːr vɔrˈɡanʊɡ]), was one of the thirteen counties of Wales that existed from 1536 until their abolition in 1974. It is located in South Wales. Originally an early medieval petty kingdom of varying boundaries known in Welsh as Morgannwg (or Glywysing), which was then invaded and taken over by the Normans as the Lordship of Glamorgan. The area that became known as Glamorgan was both a rural, pastoral area, and a conflict point between the Norman lords and the Welsh princes. It was defined by a large concentration of castles.

After falling under English rule in the 16th century, Glamorgan became a more stable county, and exploited its natural resources to become an important part of the Industrial Revolution. Glamorgan was the most populous and industrialised county in Wales, and was once called the "crucible of the Industrial Revolution", as it contained the world centres of three metallurgical industries (iron, steel and copper) and its rich resources of coal.

Under the Local Government Act 1972, the county boroughs and administrative county of Glamorgan were abolished on 1 April 1974, with three new counties being established, each containing a former county borough: West Glamorgan, Mid Glamorgan, South Glamorgan. The name also survives in that of Vale of Glamorgan, a county borough.

Glamorgan comprised distinct regions: the industrial valleys, the agricultural vale and the scenic Gower Peninsula. The county had boundaries with Brecknockshire (north), Monmouthshire (east), Carmarthenshire (west), and to the south it was bordered by the Bristol Channel. The total area was 2,100 km^{2} (811 sq mi). Glamorgan contained two cities, Cardiff, the county town and from 1955 the capital city of Wales, and Swansea. The highest point in the county was Craig y Llyn (600 metres (1,969 ft)) near the village of Rhigos in the Cynon Valley.

== History ==
=== Origins ===
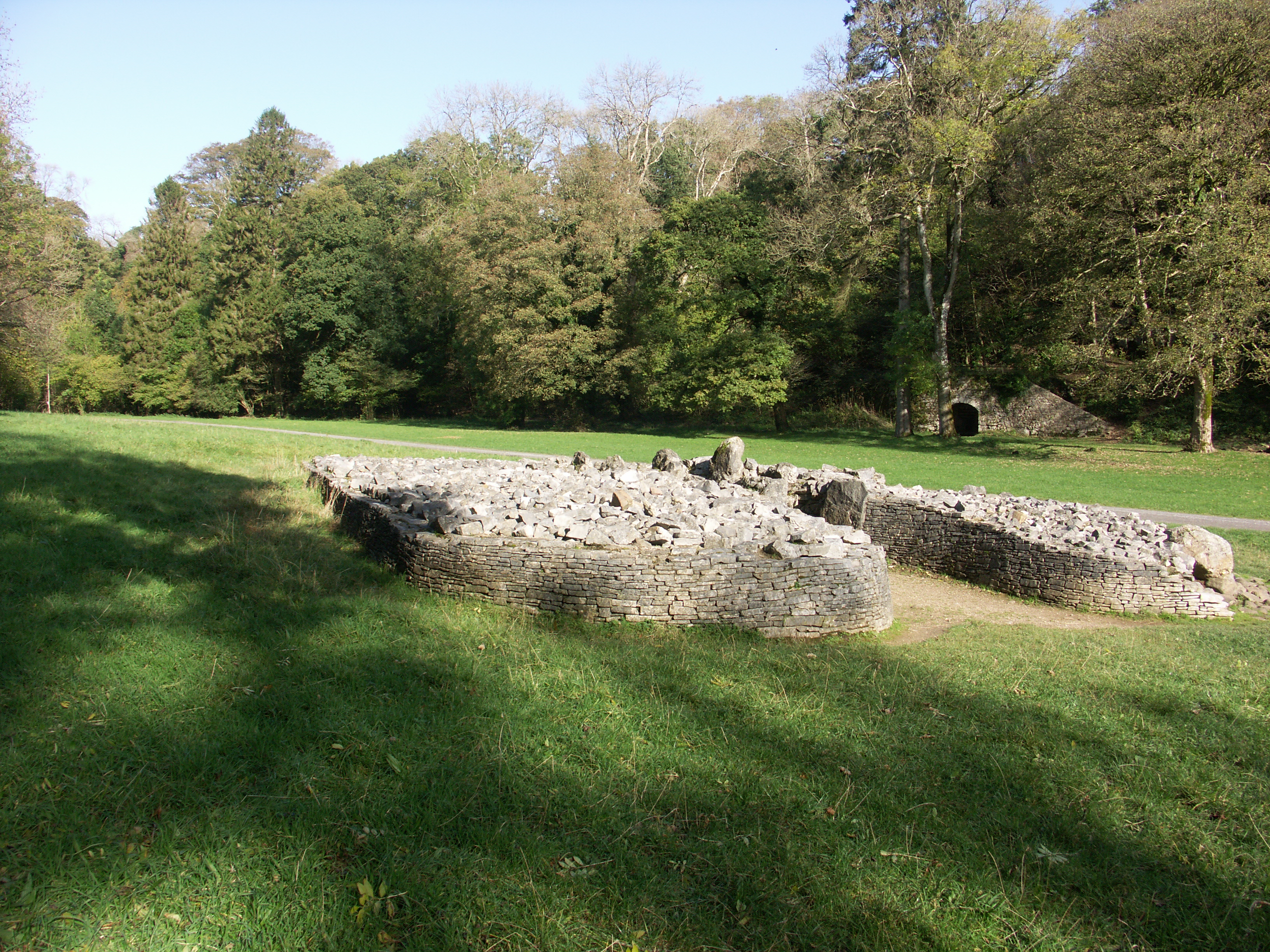
Parc Cwm long cairn a Neolithic chambered tomb on the Gower Peninsula

Glamorgan's terrain has been inhabited by humankind for over 200,000 years. Climate fluctuation caused the formation, disappearance, and reformation of glaciers which, in turn, caused sea levels to rise and fall. At various times life has flourished, at others the area is likely to have been completely uninhabitable. Evidence of the presence of Neanderthals has been discovered on the Gower Peninsula. Whether they remained in the area during periods of extreme cold is unclear. Sea levels have been 150 metres (490 ft) lower and 8 metres (26 ft) higher than at present, resulting in significant changes to the coastline during this period.

Archaeological evidence shows that humans settled in the area during an interstadial period. The oldest known human burial in Great Britain – the Red Lady of Paviland – was discovered in a coastal cave between Port Eynon and Rhossili, on the Gower Peninsula. The 'lady' has been radiocarbon dated to c. 29,000 years before present (BP) – during the Late Pleistocene – at which time the cave overlooked an area of plain, some miles from the sea.

From the end of the last ice age (between 12,000 and 10,000 BP) Mesolithic hunter-gatherers began to migrate to the British Peninsula – through Doggerland – from the European mainland. Archaeologist Stephen Aldhouse-Green notes that while Wales has a "multitude" of Mesolithic sites, their settlements were "focused on the coastal plains", the uplands were "exploited only by specialist hunting groups".

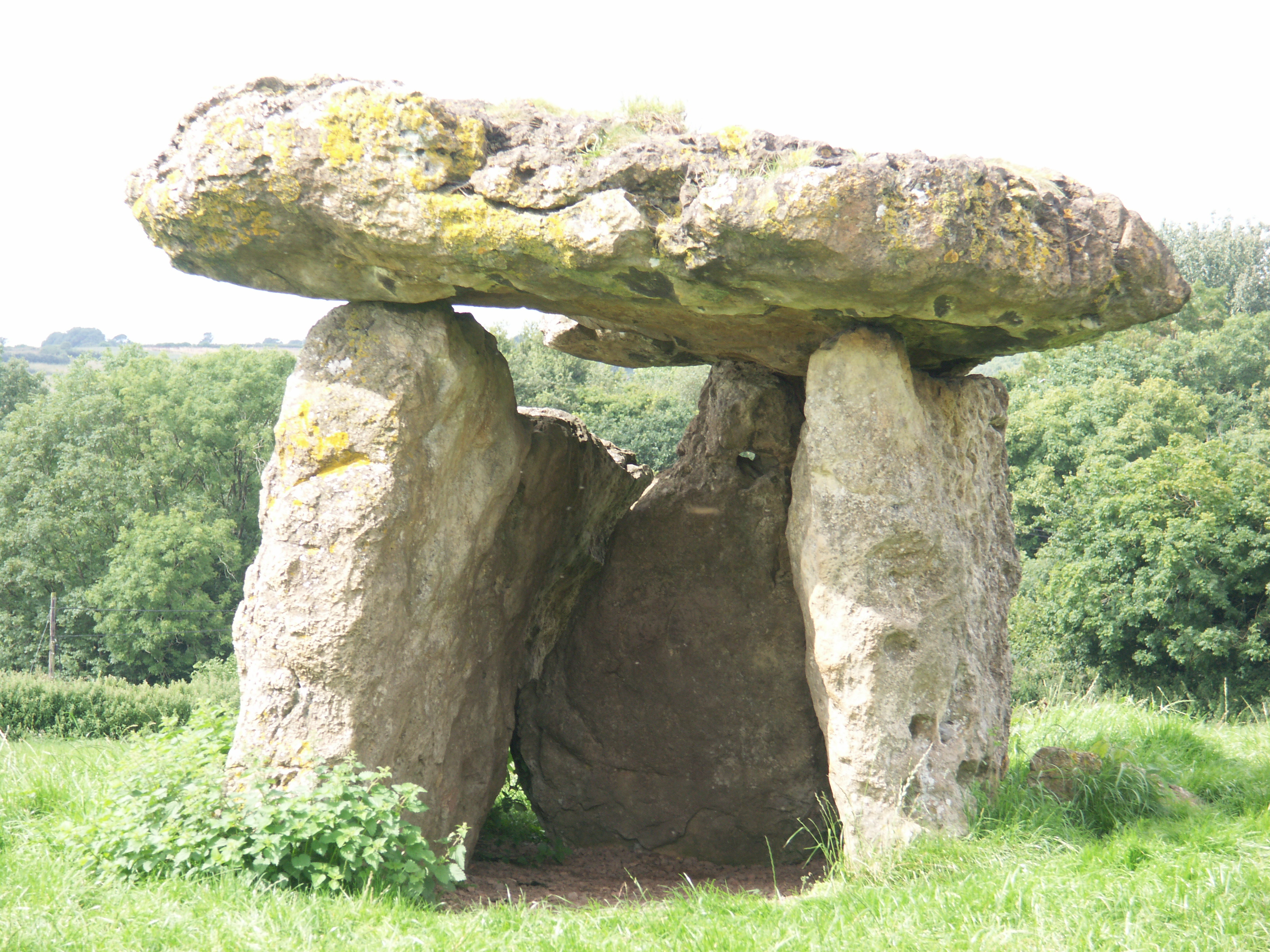
St Lythans burial chamber, a Neolithic portal dolmen in the Vale of Glamorgan

Human lifestyles in North-West Europe changed around 6000 BP; from the Mesolithic nomadic lives of hunting and gathering, to the Neolithic agrarian life of agriculture and settlement. They cleared the forests to establish pasture and to cultivate the land and developed new technologies such as ceramics and textile production. A tradition of long barrow construction began in continental Europe during the 7th millennium BP – the free standing megalithic structures supporting a sloping capstone (known as dolmens); common over Atlantic Europe. Nineteen Neolithic chambered tombs (or long barrows) and five possible henges have been identified in Glamorgan. These megalithic burial chambers, or cromlechi, were built between 6000 and 5000 BP, during the early Neolithic period, the first of them about 1500 years before either Stonehenge or the Egyptian Great Pyramid of Giza was completed. Two major groups of Neolithic architectural traditions are represented in the area: portal dolmens (e.g. St Lythans burial chamber (Vale of Glamorgan), and Cae'rarfau (near Creigiau)); and Severn-Cotswold chamber tombs (e.g. Parc Cwm long cairn, (Parc le Breos Cwm, Gower Peninsula), and Tinkinswood burial chamber (Vale of Glamorgan)), as well as tombs that do not fall easily into either group. Such massive constructions would have needed a large labour force – up to 200 men – suggestive of large communities nearby. Archaeological evidence from some Neolithic sites (e.g. Tinkinswood) has shown the continued use of cromlechi in the Bronze Age.

The Bronze Age – defined by the use of metal – has made a lasting impression on the area. Over six hundred Bronze Age barrows and cairns, of various types, have been identified all over Glamorgan. Other technological innovations – including the wheel; harnessing oxen; weaving textiles; brewing alcohol; and skillful metalworking (producing new weapons and tools, and fine gold decoration and jewellery, such as brooches and torcs) – changed people's everyday lives during this period. Deforestation continued to the more remote areas as a warmer climate allowed the cultivation even of upland areas.

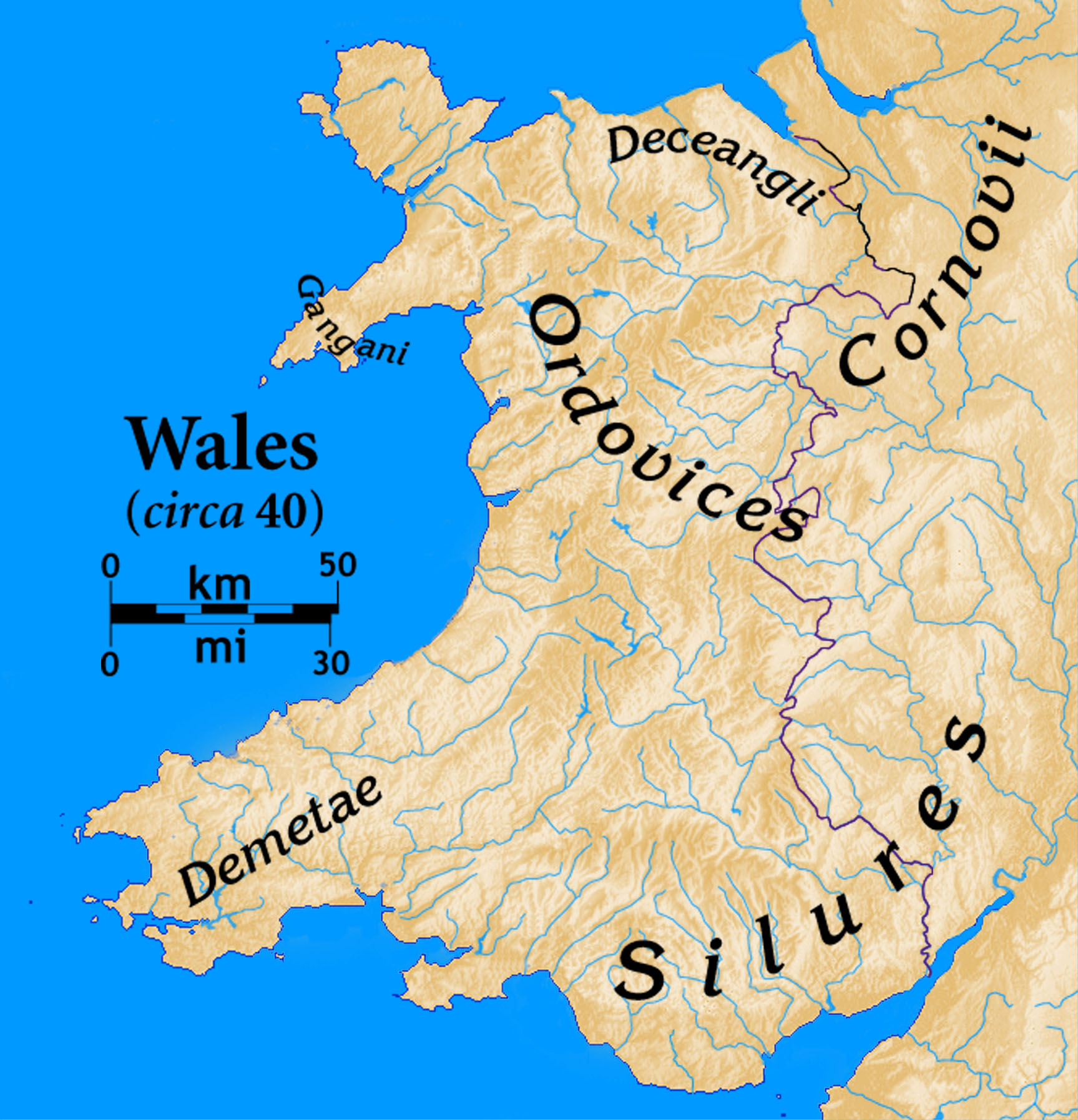
Tribes of Wales at the time of the Roman invasion (The modern border with England is also shown)

By 4000 BP people had begun to bury, or cremate their dead in individual cists, beneath a mound of earth known as a round barrow; sometimes with a distinctive style of finely decorated pottery – like those at Llanharry (discovered 1929) and at Llandaff (1991) – that gave rise to the Early Bronze Age being described as Beaker culture. From c. 3350 BP, a worsening climate began to make agriculture unsustainable in upland areas. The resulting population pressures appear to have led to conflict. Hill forts began to be built from the Late Bronze Age (and throughout the Iron Age (3150–1900 BP)) and the amount and quality of weapons increased noticeably – along the regionally distinctive tribal lines of the Iron Age.

Archaeological evidence from two sites in Glamorgan shows Bronze Age practices and settlements continued into the Iron Age. Finds from Llyn Fawr, thought to be votive offerings, include weapons and tools from the Late Bronze Age and the Early Iron Age. The hoard, described as "one of the most significant prehistoric metalwork hoards in Wales" has given its name to the Llyn Fawr Phase, the last Bronze Age phase in Britain. Excavations at Llanmaes, Vale of Glamorgan, indicate a settlement and "feasting site" occupied from the Late Bronze Age until the Roman occupation. Until the Roman conquest of Britain, the area that would become known as Glamorgan was part of the territory of the Silures – a Celtic British tribe that flourished in the Iron Age – whose territory also included the areas that would become known as Breconshire and Monmouthshire. The Silures had hill forts throughout the area – e.g., Caerau (Cardiff), Caerau hill fort, Rhiwsaeson (Llantrisant), and Y Bwlwarcau [Mynydd Margam], south west of Maesteg – and cliff castles along the Glamorgan coast – e.g., Burry Holms (Gower Peninsula). Excavations at one – Dunraven hill fort (Southerndown, Vale of Glamorgan) – revealed the remains of twenty-one roundhouses.

Many other settlements of the Silures were neither hill forts nor castles. For example, the 3.2-hectare (8-acre) fort established by the Romans near the estuary of the River Taff in 75 AD, in what would become Cardiff, was built over an extensive settlement established by the Silures in the 50s AD.

=== Morgannwg ===
==== Early history ====
The region originated as an independent petty kingdom named Glywysing, believed to be named after a 5th-century Welsh king called Glywys, who is said to have been descended from a Roman Governor in the region. Saint Paul Aurelian was born in Glamorgan in the 6th century. The names Morgannwg (Morgan + territorial suffix -wg, 'territory of Morgan') and Glamorgan (gwlad + Morgan, 'land of Morgan') reputedly derive from the 8th-century king Morgan ab Athrwys, otherwise known as "Morgan Mwynfawr" ('great in riches') who united Glywysing with the neighbouring kingdoms of Gwent and Ergyng, although some have argued for the similar 10th-century ruler Morgan Hen. It is possible it was only the union of Gwent and Glywysing that was referred to as Morgannwg. By virtue of its location and geography, Morgannwg or Glywysing was the second part of Wales, after Gwent, to fall under the control of the Normans and was frequently the scene of fighting between the Marcher Lords and Welsh princes.

==== Early buildings ====
The earliest buildings of note included earthwork dykes and rudimentary motte-and-bailey hillside defences. All that remains of these fortifications are foundations that leave archaeological evidence of their existence, though many were built upon to create more permanent defensive structures. The earliest surviving structures within the region are early stone monuments, waypoints and grave markers dating between the 5th and 7th century, with many being moved from their original position to sheltered locations for protection. The most notable of the early stone markers still in its original place is on a high mountain ridge at Gelligaer. Of the later plaitwork patterned standing crosses the finest and best preserved is the 9th century 'Houelt' stone at Llantwit Major.

=== Lordship of Glamorgan ===
==== History, 1080–1536 ====
The Lordship of Glamorgan was established by Robert Fitzhamon following the defeat of Iestyn ap Gwrgant, c. 1080. The Lordship of Morgannwg was split after it was conquered; the kingdom of Glamorgan had as its caput the town of Cardiff and took in the lands from the River Tawe to the River Rhymney. The Lordship took in four of the Welsh cantrefi, Gorfynydd, Penychen, Senghenydd and Gwynllwg. The area later known as the Gower Peninsula was not under the Lordship of Glamorgan, and became the Gower Lordship which had previously been the cantref of Gŵyr. The lowlands of the Lordship of Glamorgan were manorialized, while much of the sparsely populated uplands were left under Welsh control until the late 13th century. Upon the death of William, Lord of Glamorgan, his extensive holdings were eventually granted to Gilbert de Clare in 1217. The subjugation of Glamorgan, begun by Fitzhamon, was finally completed by the powerful De Clare family, and in 1486 the kingdom was granted to Jasper Tudor.

==== Buildings, 1080–1536 ====
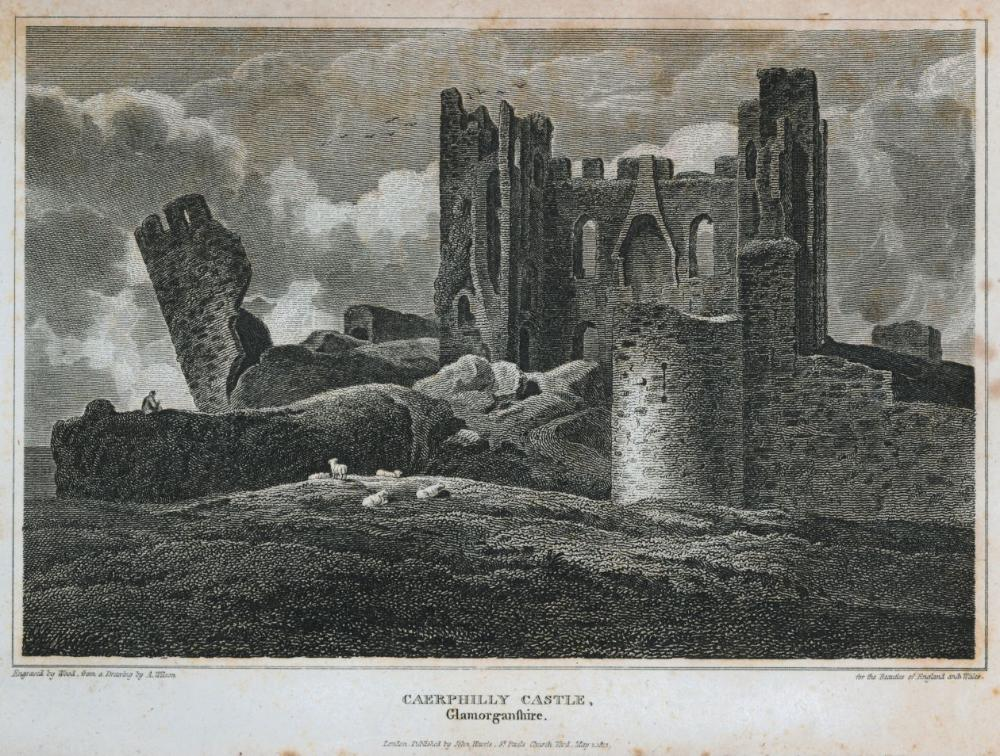
Caerphilly castle, c. 1812

The legacy of the Marcher Lords left the area scattered with historic buildings including Norman castles, Cistercian Abbeys, churches and medieval monuments.

The kingdom of Glamorgan was also notable for the number of castles built during the time of the Marcher Lords, many surviving to the present day though many are now ruinous. Of the castles built during the medieval period, those still standing above foundation level include, Caerphilly Castle, Cardiff Castle, Ogmore Castle, St Donat's Castle, St Quintins Castle, Coity Castle, Neath Castle, and Oystermouth Castle. Many of the castles within Morgannwg were attacked by forces led by Owain Glyndŵr during the Welsh Revolt of 1400–1415. Some were captured, and several were damaged to such an extent they were never maintained as defences again.

When the Diocese of Llandaff became incorporated into the Province of Canterbury, the Bishop of Llandaff rebuilt over the small church with the beginnings of Llandaff Cathedral in 1120. In the western region of Morgannwg two monastic foundations were sited, a Savigniac house in Neath in 1130 and the Cistercian Margam Abbey in 1147. In the Vale a Benedictine monastery was founded in 1141, Ewenny Priory, a community under the patronage of St. Peter's Gloucester. The building of parish churches also began in the 12th century, densely in the Vale, but very sparsely in the upland and northern areas.

=== County of Glamorgan ===
==== History 1536–1750 ====
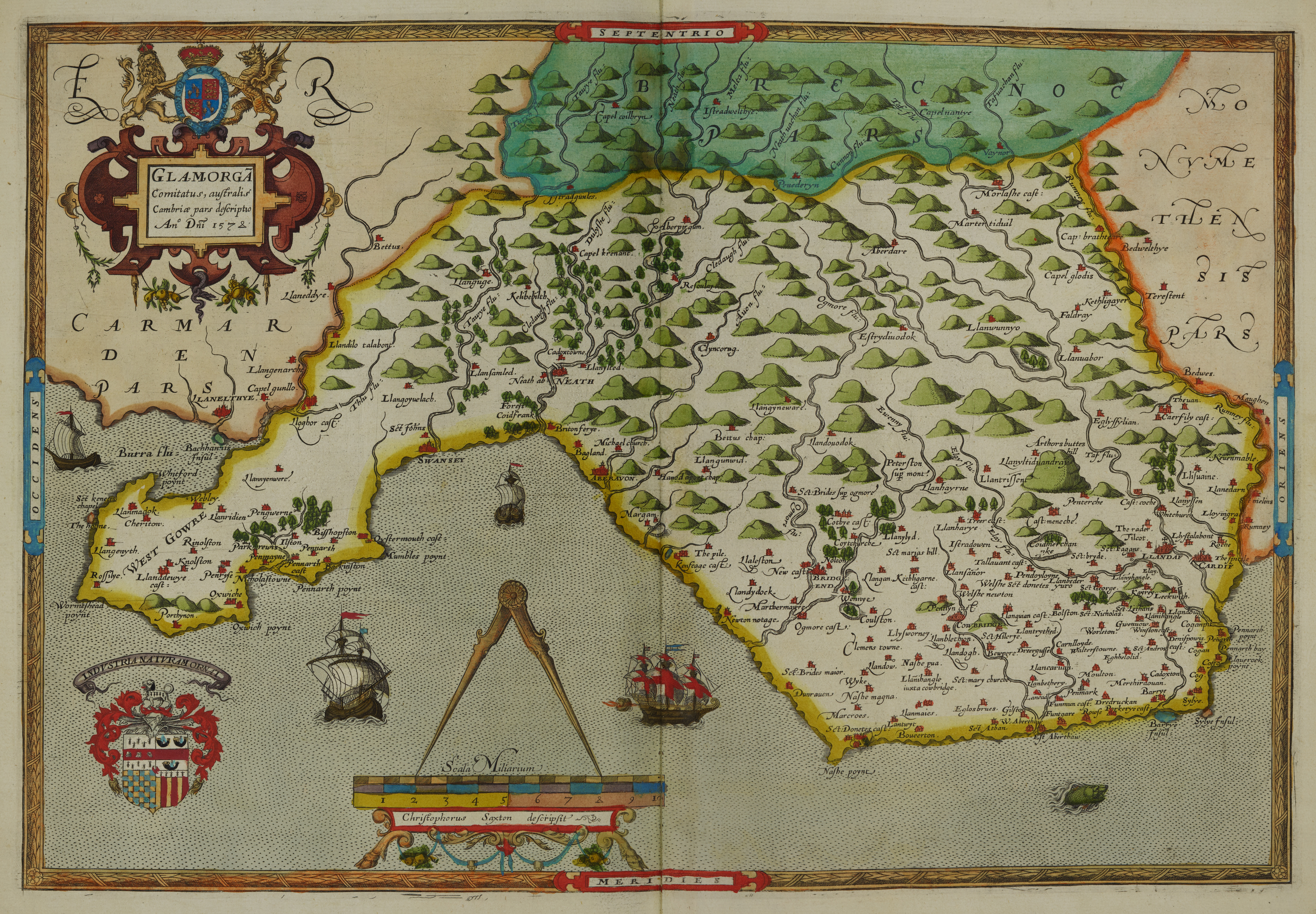
Hand-drawn map of Glamorgan by Christopher Saxton from 1578

The Laws in Wales Acts of 1535 established the County of Glamorgan through the amalgamation of the Lordship of Glamorgan with the lordships of Gower and Kilvey; the area that had previously been the cantref of Gwynllwg was lost to Monmouthshire. With Wales finally incorporated with the English dominions, the administration of justice passed into the hands of the crown. The Lordship became a shire and was awarded its first parliamentary representative with the creation of the Glamorganshire constituency in 1536. The Reformation, which was closely followed by the Dissolution of the Monasteries, led to vast social changes across Britain. These events, along with the Act of Union, allowed the leading Welsh families to gain in wealth and prosperity, allowing equal footing to those families of English extraction. Old monasteries, with their lands, were acquired by the wealthy and turned into country houses; their notable residents preferring to live in gentry houses rather than the fortified castles of the past. Major families in Glamorgan included the Carnes at Ewenny, the Mansels at Margam, Williams of Neath, the Herberts at Cardiff and Swansea, Sir David Ap Mathew of Llandaff, and the Stradlings of St Donats.

The main industry of Glamorgan during this period was agriculture. In the upland, or Blaenau area, the hilly terrain along with many areas being densely wooded, made arable farming unprofitable, so the local farming concentrated on the rearing of horses, cattle and sheep. The lowland, or Bro was devoted to more general branches of farming, cereal, grass for pasture, hay and stock raising. Non-agricultural industries were generally small scale, with some shallow coal pits, fulling mills, weaving and pottery-making. The main heavy industry of note during this period was copper smelting, and this was centred on the towns of Swansea and Neath. Although copper had been mined in Wales since the Bronze Age, it was not until non-ferrous metalworking became a major industry in the late 17th century that Glamorgan saw a concentration of works appearing in a belt between Kidwelly and Port Talbot. Smelting of copper started around Neath under the Mines Royal Society c. 1584 but the scale of the works increased dramatically from the early 18th century when Swansea displaced Bristol as Britain's copper smelting capital. Easy access to Cornish ores and a local outcropping of coal near the surface, gave Swansea economic advantages in the smelting industry.

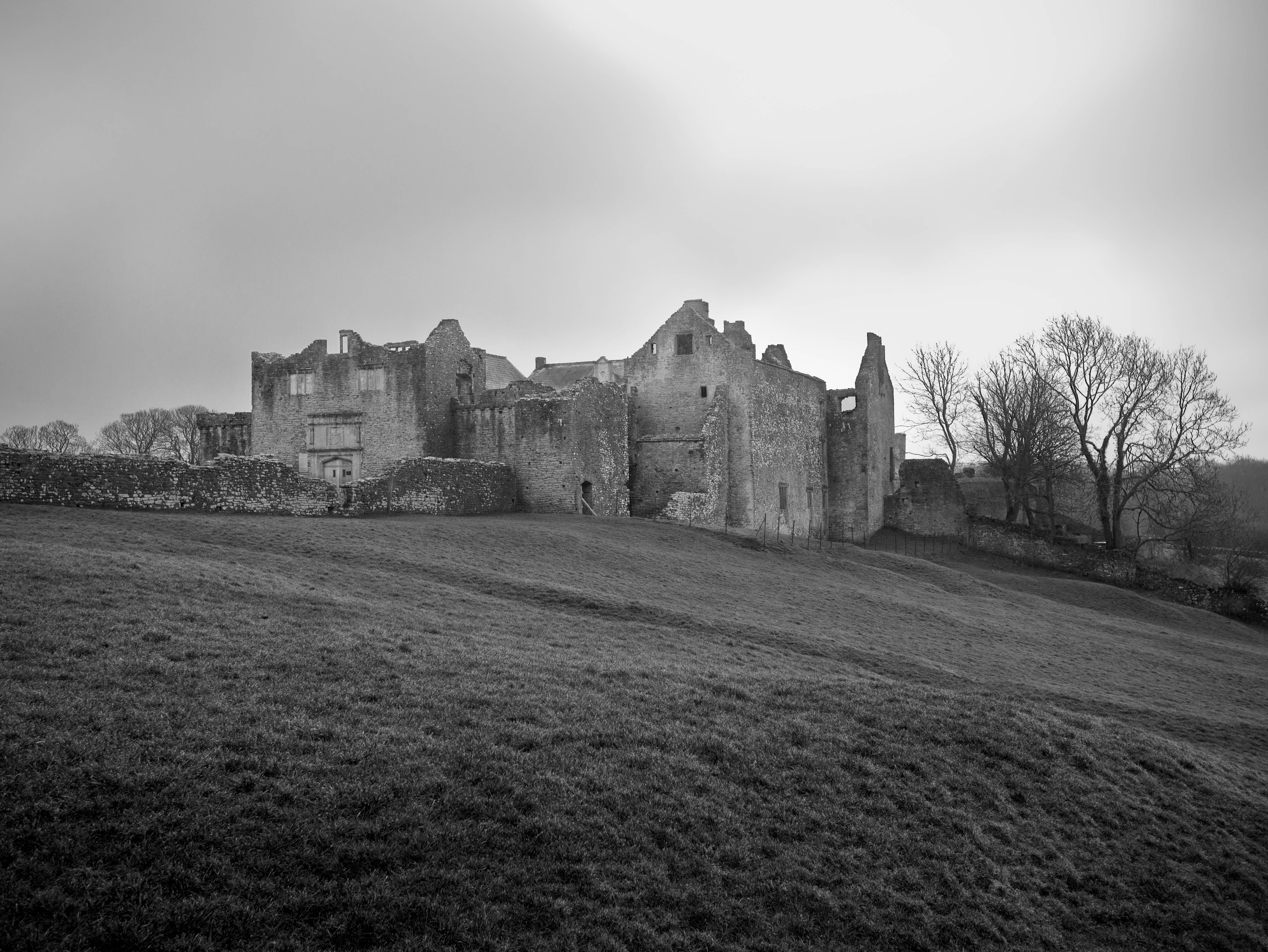
Beaupre Castle

Early iron smelting within Glamorgan was a localised and minor industry, with historical evidence pointing to scattered ironworks throughout the county. John Leland mentions a works at Llantrisant in 1539, an operation in Aberdare existed during the reign of Edward VI and two iron furnaces were recorded as being set up by Sir W. Mathew in Radyr during the Elizabethan era. By 1666 a furnace was in operation in Hirwaun and in 1680 a smelting hearth was established in Caerphilly. Despite the existence of these industries, the scale of production was small, and in 1740 the total output of iron from Glamorgan was reported at 400 tons per year.

Glamorgan, now falling under the protection of the crown, was also involved in the conflicts of the crown. With the start of the First English Civil War, there was little support from the Welsh for the Parliamentarians. Glamorgan sent troops to join Charles I at the Battle of Edgehill, and their Member of Parliament Sir Edward Stradling was captured in the conflict. In the Second English Civil War, the war came to Glamorgan at the Battle of St Fagans (1648), where the New Model Army overcame a larger Royalist to prevent a siege of Cardiff.

==== Buildings, 1536–1750 ====
The period between the Laws in Wales Acts and the industrialisation of Glamorgan saw two distinct periods architecturally. From the 1530s throughout to 1650, the newly empowered gentry attempted to show their status by building stately homes to show their wealth; but the period from 1650 through to the mid-1750s was a fallow time for architectural grandeur, with few new wealthy families moving to the area. Of the eight major gentry houses of the time only St Fagans Castle survives with its interior intact; five, Neath Abbey, Old Beaupre Castle, Oxwich Castle, Llantrithyd and Ruperra Castle are ruinous. Of the remaining two manors, The Van at Caerphilly was reconstructed in 1990 while Cefnmabli was gutted by a fire in 1994. The old castles became abandoned throughout this period due to the new security brought by Glamorgan coming under the protection of the crown, with only the Stradlings of St Donat's Castle electing to remain in their old ancestral home.

By the 17th century, the availability of fine building stone permitted the construction of high-quality lime-washed rural cottages and farmhouses in the Vale of Glamorgan, which drew favourable remarks from travellers. A Glamorgan yeoman of the time generally lived in greater comfort than his contemporaries of the more westerly or upland parts of Wales such as Cardiganshire or north Carmarthenshire.

==== Industrial Glamorgan, 1750–1920 ====
===== Metals industry =====
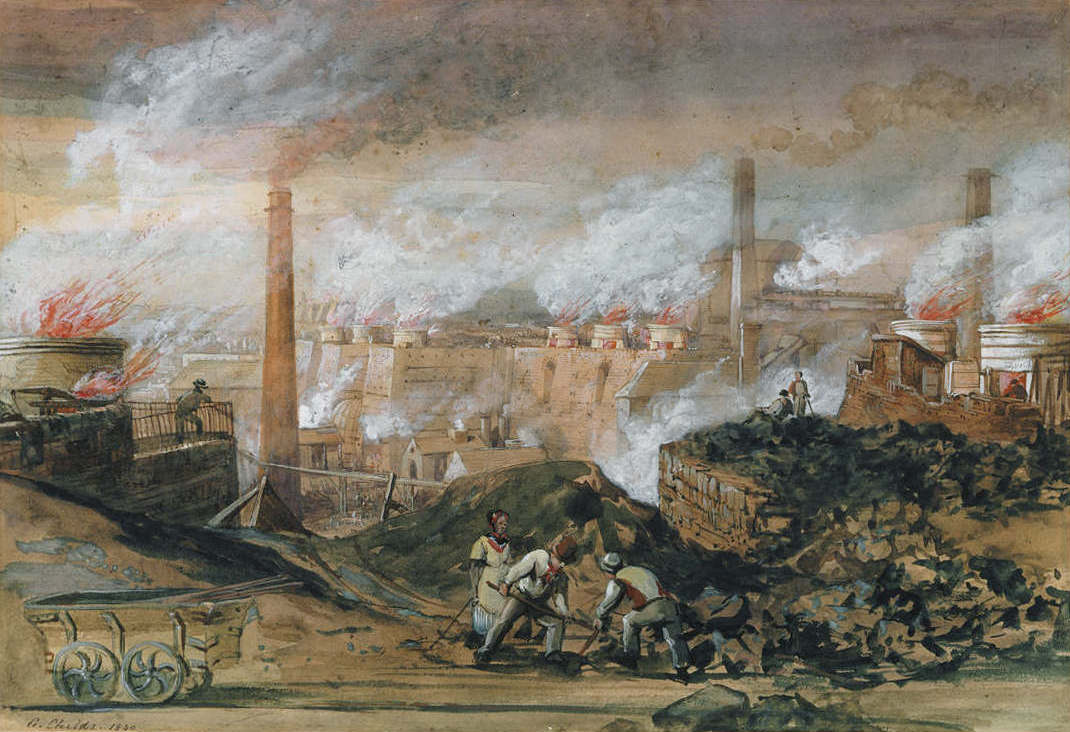
Dowlais Ironworks by George Childs (1840)

From the mid-18th century onwards, Glamorgan's uplands underwent large-scale industrialisation and several coastal towns, in particular Swansea and later Cardiff, became significant ports. From the late 18th century until the early 20th century Glamorgan produced 70 per cent of the British output of copper. The industry was developed by English entrepreneurs and investors such as John Henry Vivian and largely based in the west of the county, where coal could be purchased cheaply and ores imported from Cornwall, Devon and later much further afield. The industry was of immense importance to Swansea in particular; in 1823 the smelting works on the River Tawe, and the collieries and shipping dependent on them, supported between 8,000 and 10,000 people. Imports of copper ores reached a peak in the 1880s, after which there was a steep fall until the virtual end of the trade in the 1920s. The cost of shipping ores from distant countries, and the growth of foreign competitors, ended Glamorgan's dominance of the industry. Some of the works converted to the production of zinc and the Tawe valley also became a location for the manufacture of nickel after Ludwig Mond established a works at Clydach in 1902.

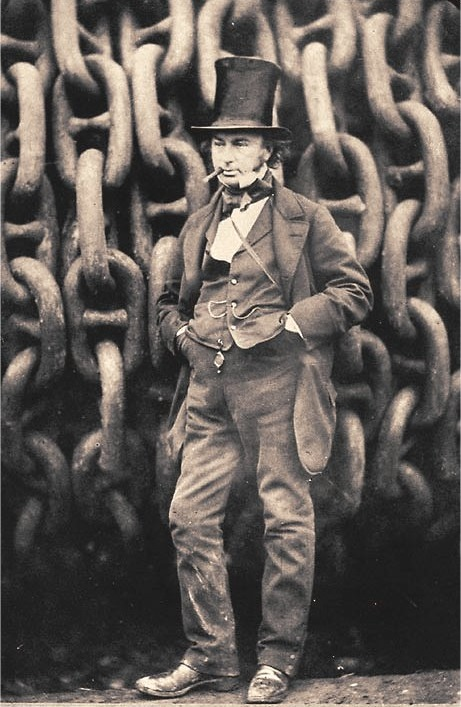
Isambard Brunel standing in front of the Great Eastern whose chains were made by Brown Lenox of Pontypridd

Even at its peak, copper smelting was never as significant as iron smelting, which was the major industrial employer of men and capital in south Wales before the rise of the sale-coal industry. Ironmaking developed in locations where ironstone, coal and limestone were found in close proximity – primarily the northern and south-western parts of the South Wales coalfield. In the second half of the 18th century four ironworks were built in Merthyr Tydfil. In 1759 the Dowlais Ironworks were established by a partnership of nine men. This was followed by the Plymouth Ironworks in 1763, which was formed by Isaac Wilkinson and John Guest, then in 1765 Anthony Bacon established the Cyfarthfa Ironworks. The fourth of the great ironworks, Penydarren Ironworks was built in 1784. These works made Merthyr Tydfil the main centre of the industry in Wales.

As well as copper and iron, Glamorgan became an important centre for the tinplate industry. Although not as famous as the Llanelli or Pontypool works, a concentrated number of works emerged around Swansea, Aberavon and Neath towards the late 19th century. Glamorgan became the most populous and industrialised county in Wales and was known as the 'crucible of the Industrial Revolution'.

Other areas to house heavy industries include ironworks in Maesteg (1826), tinplate works in Llwydarth and Pontyclun and an iron ore mine in Llanharry.

Alongside the metalworks, industries appeared throughout Glamorgan that made use of the works' output. Pontypridd was well known for the Brown Lenox Chainworks, which during the 19th century was the town's main industrial employer.

===== Coal industry =====
The largest change to industrial Glamorgan was the opening up of the South Wales coalfield, the largest continuous coalfield in Britain, which occupied the greater part of Glamorgan, mostly north of the Vale. The coalfield provided a vast range in quality and type, but prior to 1750 the only real access to the seams was through bell pits or digging horizontally into a level where the seam was exposed at a river bank or mountainside. Although initially excavated for export, coal was soon also needed for the smelting process in Britain's expanding metallurgical industries. Developments in coal mining began in the north-eastern rim of Glamorgan around the ironworks of Merthyr and in the south-west around the copper plants of Swansea. In 1828 the South Wales coalfield was producing an estimated 3 million tons of coal, by 1840 that had risen to 4.5 million, with about 70 percent consumed by local commercial and domestic usage.

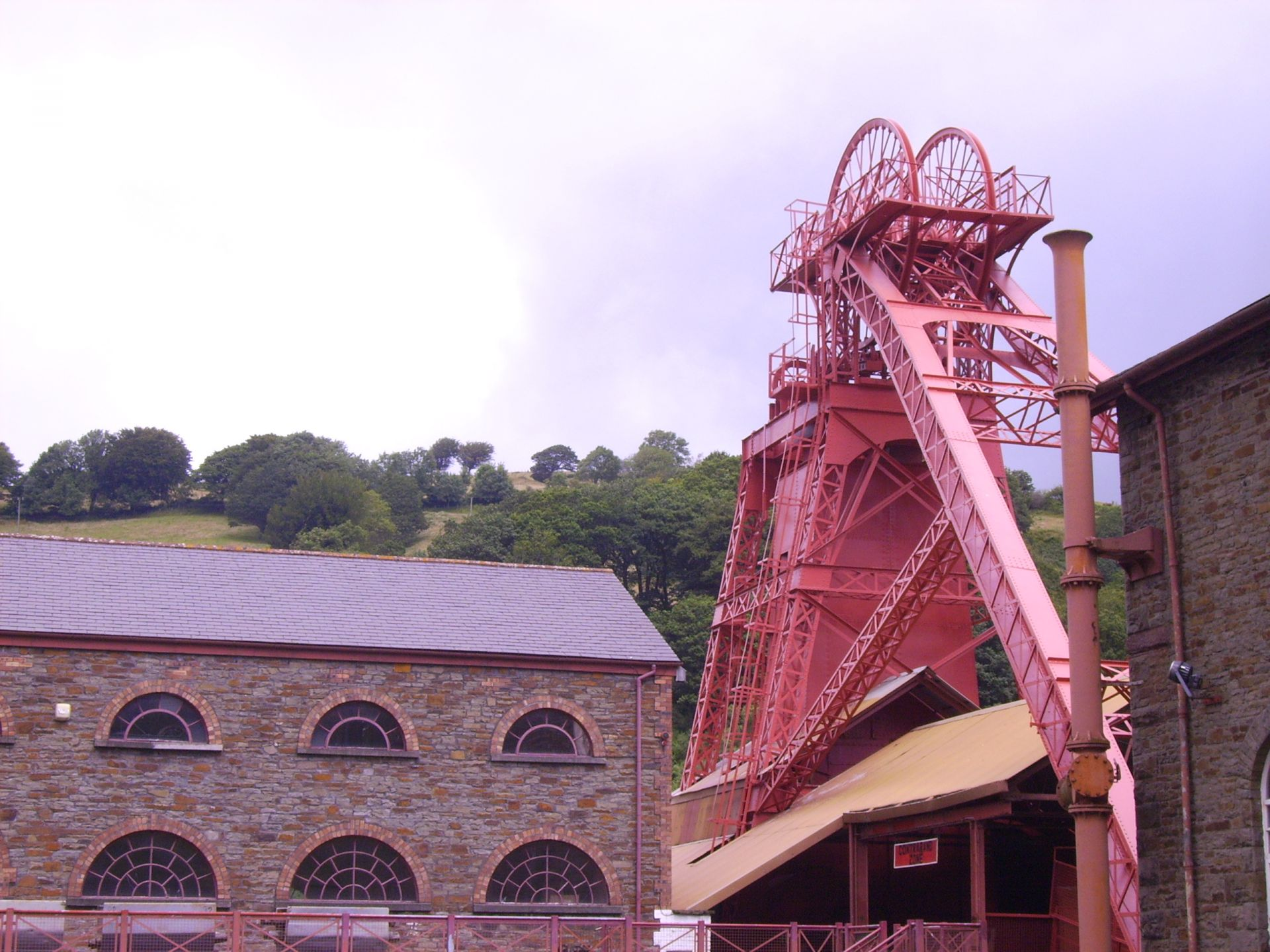
Lewis Merthyr Colliery, Rhondda which, since 1986, has been redeveloped for opening to the public as the Rhondda Heritage Park.

The 1840s saw the start of a dramatic increase in the amount of coal excavated within Glamorgan. Several events took place to precipitate the growth in coal mining, including the discovery of steam coal in the Cynon Valley, the building of a large masonry dock at Cardiff and the construction of the Taff Vale Railway. In 1845, after trials by the British Admiralty, Welsh steam coal replaced coal from Newcastle-upon-Tyne as the preferred fuel for the ships of the Royal Navy. Glamorgan steam coal quickly became a sought-after commodity for navies all over the world and its production increased to meet the demand.

The richest source for steam coal was the Rhondda Valleys, and by 1856 the Taff Vale Railway had reached the heads of both valleys. Over the next fifty years the Rhondda would grow to become the largest producer of coal of the age. In 1874, the Rhondda produced 2.13 million tons of coal, which rose to 5.8 million tons by 1884. The coal now produced in Glamorgan far exceeded the interior demand, and in the later half of the 19th century the area became a mass exporter for its product. In the 1890s the docks of South Wales accounted for 38 percent of British coal exports and a quarter of global trade.

Along with the increase in coal production came a very large increase in the population, as people emigrated to the area to seek employment. In Aberdare the population grew from 6,471 in 1841 to 32,299 in 1851 while the Rhondda grew from 3,035 in 1861 to 55,632 in 1881, peaking in 1921 at 162,729. Much of this population growth was driven by immigration. In the ten years from 1881 to 1891, net migration to Glamorgan was over 76,000, 63 percent of which was from the non-border counties of England – a proportion that increased in the following decade.

===== Agriculture =====
Until the beginning of the 18th century, Glamorgan was almost entirely agriculture based. With the industrialisation of the county, farming became of far less importance, with industrial areas encroaching into farming lands. In Glamorgan, from the late 19th century, there was a significant reduction away from arable land towards pasture land. There were two main factors behind this trend; firstly the increase in the population of the county required more milk and other dairy produce, in an age before refrigeration. Secondly there was an employment shortage in farming due to the call of better paid industrial work, and pastoral land was less work intensive. Stock rearing became prominent with breeds such as Hereford, Devon and Shorthorn cattle being bred in the Vale of Glamorgan, while the unenclosed wilds of the Gower saw Welsh Ponies bred on the commons.

==== Buildings of note 1750–1920 ====
The industrial period of Glamorgan saw a massive building program throughout the uplands and in the coastal regions, reflecting the increasing population and the need for new cheap housing to accommodate the hundreds of thousands of workers coming into the area. As the towns urbanised and the hamlets became villages, the trappings of modern life were reflected in the buildings required to sustain new and growing communities. The period saw the appearance, not only of the works and pits themselves, but of the terrace house or miners cottage, railway stations, hospitals, churches, chapels, bridges, viaducts, stadiums, schools, universities, museums and workingmen's halls.

As well as the architecture of Glamorgan entering modernity, there was also a reflection to the past, with some individuals who made the most from the booming industrial economy restoring symbols of the past, building follies and commissioning Gothic-style additions to ancient churches. Robert Lugar's Cyfarthfa Castle in Merthyr (1825) and the late 19th century additions to Cardiff Castle, designed by William Burges, exemplify how Gothic was the favoured style for rich industrialists and entrepreneurs. Greek Revival architecture, popularised in France and Germany in the late 18th century, was used for a number of public and educational buildings in Wales including the Royal Institution of South Wales in Swansea (1841) and Bridgend Town Hall (1843).

In 1897, Cardiff Corporation acquired land from the Marquess of Bute with the intention of erecting buildings to meet the administrative, legal and educational needs of Glamorgan's county town. From 1901 onwards, Cathays Park was developed into "possibly the finest... civic centre in Britain" with a range of public buildings including the Baroque City Hall and the rococo-style University College.

The majority of Nonconformist chapels were built in the 19th century. They progressed from simple, single-storey designs to larger and more elaborate structures, most built in the classical style. Perhaps the most ambitious chapel was John Humphrey's Morriston Tabernacle (1872), incorporating Classical, Romanesque and Gothic elements, which has been called the 'Noncomformist Cathedral of Wales'.

Industrial architecture tended to be functional, although some structures, such as the four-storey engine house at Cyfarthfa Ironworks (1836), were built to impress. Coal mining eventually became the dominant industry in Glamorgan and tall winding towers – originally made of timber or cast iron, later steel – became symbolic icons.

==== Late-period Glamorgan, 1920–1974 ====
After the First World War, there was an initial drop in coal and iron production, there was still enough demand to push the coalfields to their limits, helped by events such as the American coal miners' strike. Cardiff Docks reached an exporting peak in 1923, but soon production fell and unemployment in the upland valleys began to increase at a dramatic rate. Between April 1924 and August 1925 the unemployment rate amongst South Wales miners jumped from 1.8% to 28.5%. Several factors came together to cause this collapse, including the over-valuation of sterling, the end of the coal subsidy, the growth of electric power, the adoption of oil as the fuel of choice for many industries, and over-expansion of the mines in the late nineteenth century. The Welsh coal owners had failed to invest mechanisation during the good years, and by the 1930s the South Wales Coalfield had the lowest productivity, highest production costs and smallest profits of all Britain's coal-producing regions.

These structural problems were followed by the General Strike of 1926 and then most disastrously the interwar depression of 1929–1931, which changed the face of industrial Glamorgan forever. In 1932, Glamorgan had an unemployment rate of more than 40 per cent, and one of the highest proportions of people receiving poor relief in the United Kingdom. This was a contrast with relatively recent prosperity: for example, in 1913 unemployment in Merthyr was below 2 per cent and the borough had 24,000 miners. By 1921, the number of employed miners had fallen to 16,000, and in 1934, it was down to 8,000.

Steel production was no less depressed than the coal industry. The inter-war years saw the closure of the old Cyfarthfa and Dowlais works, as steel-making became increasingly concentrated in the coastal belt. Both the coal and steel industries were increasingly dominated by large amalgamations, such as Powell Duffryn and Guest, Keen and Nettlefolds. The smaller companies progressively disappeared.

Glamorgan suffered disproportionately during the Great Depression because of the high proportion of its workforce employed in primary production rather than the manufacture of finished products. Other parts of Britain began to recover as domestic demand for consumer products picked up, but unemployment in the South Wales Valleys continued to rise: the jobless rate in Merthyr reached 47.5 per cent in June 1935. However, the coastal ports, Cardiff and Swansea, managed to sustain a "reasonable" level of economic activity, and the anthracite coalfield in western Glamorgan (and eastern Carmarthenshire) also managed to maintain production and exports above pre-war levels.

With the outbreak of World War II the coalfields of Glamorgan saw a sharp rise in trade and employment. Despite the demand the want for the youth to conscript in the war effort in the valley areas meant that there was a shortage of workers to run the mines; this in turn saw the introduction of the Bevin Boys, workers conscripted to work in the mines. During the war both Cardiff and Swansea were targets for German air attacks due to their important docks.

==== Buildings and structures, 1920–1974 ====
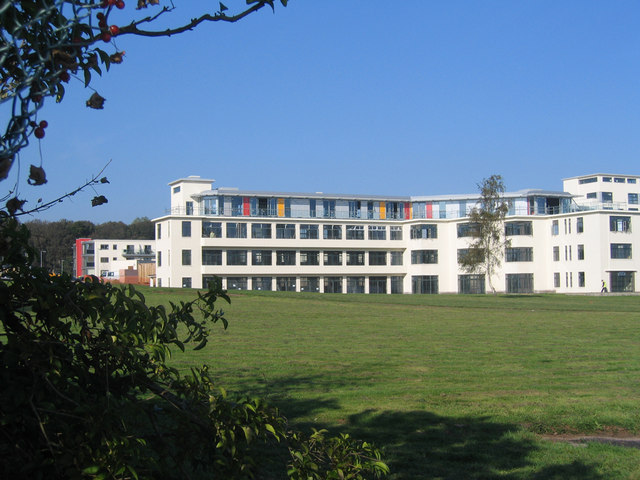
Sully Hospital, now apartments

After the First World War, Glamorgan, as was typical for Britain as a whole, entered a period of modernity, which saw buildings built and designed for functionality rather than splendour with period features watered down. As the century progressed, symbols of the past industrial period were torn down and replaced with industrial estates populated by unadorned geometric factories. With concrete becoming the favourite post-war building material, larger office blocks began appearing within the cities, though few were of any architectural significance.

Despite entering a fallow period of architectural design, several structures of note did emerge. Although work began in 1911, The National Museum of Wales (Smith and Brewer) was not completed until 1927 due to the First World War. Designed to reflect sympathetically in dimensions with its neighbouring city hall, the dome-topped museum combines many architectural motifs with Doric columns at its facade, while internally a large entrance hall with stairs, landings and balconies. Percy Thomas' Guildhall in Swansea, an example of the 'stripped modernist' style completed in 1936, was described as "Wales' finest interwar building".

Although functionality often deprived a building of interest, Sully Hospital (Pite, Son & Fairweather) is an example of a building which gained from its functional requirements. Initially built for tubercular patients, whose cure required the maximum amount of light and air, the functional architecture left a striking glass-fronted building, completed in 1936.

Another hospital to which functionalism was applied was the University Hospital of Wales (S.W. Milburn & Partners). Begun in the 1960s, and completed in 1971, the building is the third largest hospital in the United Kingdom and the largest in Wales. It was designed to bring the care of patients, research and medical teaching together under one roof.

The demands of modern living saw the growth of housing estates throughout Glamorgan, moving away from the Victorian terrace of Cardiff or the ribbon cottages of the valleys. Several of these projects were failures architecturally and socially. Of note were the Billybanks estate in Penarth and Penrhys Estate (Alex Robertson, Peter Francis & Partners) in the Rhondda, both described by Malcolm Parry, the former Head of the School of Architecture at Cardiff University, as "...the worst examples of architecture and planning in Wales."

== Geography ==
The area that was Glamorgan can be divided into three distinct and contrasting geographical areas. To the south east is a gently undulating limestone plateau, virtually coterminous with the modern county borough of Vale of Glamorgan, mainly comprising farmland and small villages stretching from Porthcawl to Cardiff. The lowlands are geographically the best environment for agriculture of the three areas. Settlements in the area included Cardiff, Barry, Bridgend, Cowbridge, Penarth and Porthcawl.

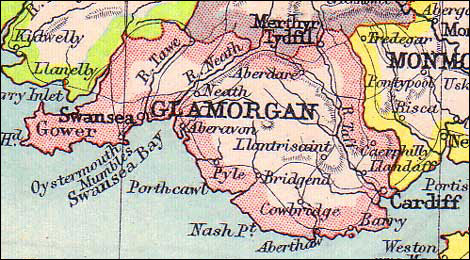
A Victorian map of Glamorgan

The northern part of the county was a mountainous area, dissected by deep narrow valleys. At the southern edge of the Brecon Beacons, the simple geological structure of Old Red Sandstone gives way to Carboniferous rocks; limestone, shales and millstone grit. In the 19th century, industrial and population growth in the coal-bearing valleys of the Rhymney, Taff, Dare and Rhondda gave rise to a form of urbanisation characterised as ribbon development. The last deep mine, Tower Colliery at Hirwaun, closed in January 2008. A few small drift mines like Unity Mine (formerly Pentreclwydau South) near Glynneath remain. Towns in the region included Aberdare, Caerphilly, Pontypridd, Maesteg, Merthyr Tydfil and Mountain Ash.

Further west was Swansea Bay and the Gower Peninsula, an Area of Outstanding Natural Beauty. Of all the areas, Gower was the least affected by heavy industry and the ancient landscape was the least impaired. The high ground that runs centrally through the Gower was largely uncultivated common land and its beaches and rocky coastal headlands showed little signs of the tourist trade that played an increasing role on the local economy. The major settlements of the region included Swansea, Neath and Port Talbot.

=== Coastline ===
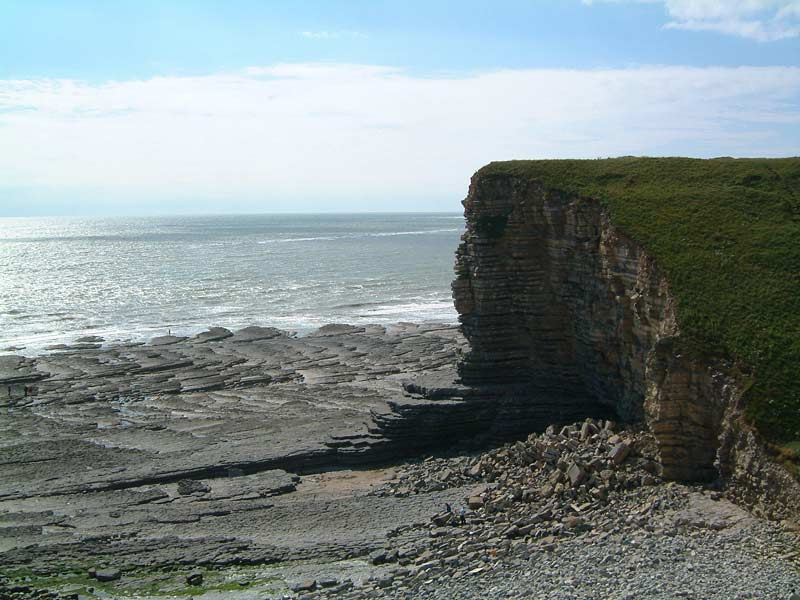
Nash Point

The coastline of Glamorgan stretched for 88 miles from Trowbridge in the east to Gower in the west. It was divided naturally into three distinct sections. The coast of the Vale of Glamorgan was mainly characterised by cliffs, while from Porthcawl to Swansea Bay wide sandy shores prevail. The final section, the Gower coast, was made up of a rugged and serrated peninsula.

From the east the first major coastline feature was the Rhymney River, once seen as the natural border between Glamorgan and Monmouthshire, until the absorption of Trowbridge into the Cardiff district in 1936. Heading west, the coast was an expanse of alluvial deposits stretching to the mouth of Glamorgan's most well known river, the River Taff. Once marshland, the area was consumed by the rapid growth of the Cardiff Docks during the industrial revolution, but with the downturn in Glamorgan's iron and coal industries, the docks declined. Also flowing into Cardiff Docks is the River Ely, which separates Cardiff from the headland and seaside resort of Penarth in the Vale of Glamorgan. Here the coast stretches southwards for two and a half miles from Penarth Head to Lavernock Point, hidden from vessels travelling up the Bristol Channel. South easterly from Lavernock Point, roughly three miles out in the Channel Estuary is Flat Holm, an island which although geographically is within the Vale, is administered as part of the city of Cardiff. Flat Holm was the most southerly point of Glamorgan and Wales.

From Lavernock Point the coast heads sharply west to the town of Barry, a well-known seaside resort, Barry is most notable for its rapid expansion during the late 19th century to become an important dock, at one stage surpassing Cardiff Dock for the tonnage of coal exported. Passing the cliffs of Barry Island the coastline becomes a low-lying promontory called the Lays, which continues west taking in the villages of Rhoose and Aberthaw before reaching Breaksea Point, the most southerly point of mainland Wales. Beyond the point is Limpert Bay, which was overlooked by the village of Gileston and the ancient encampment of Summerhouse Point. Here the cliffs rise and run for eleven miles as far as the estuary of the Ogmore. Along this run of cliffs the coast passes Llantwit Major and St Donats, before heading in a rough north-west direction at Nash Point.

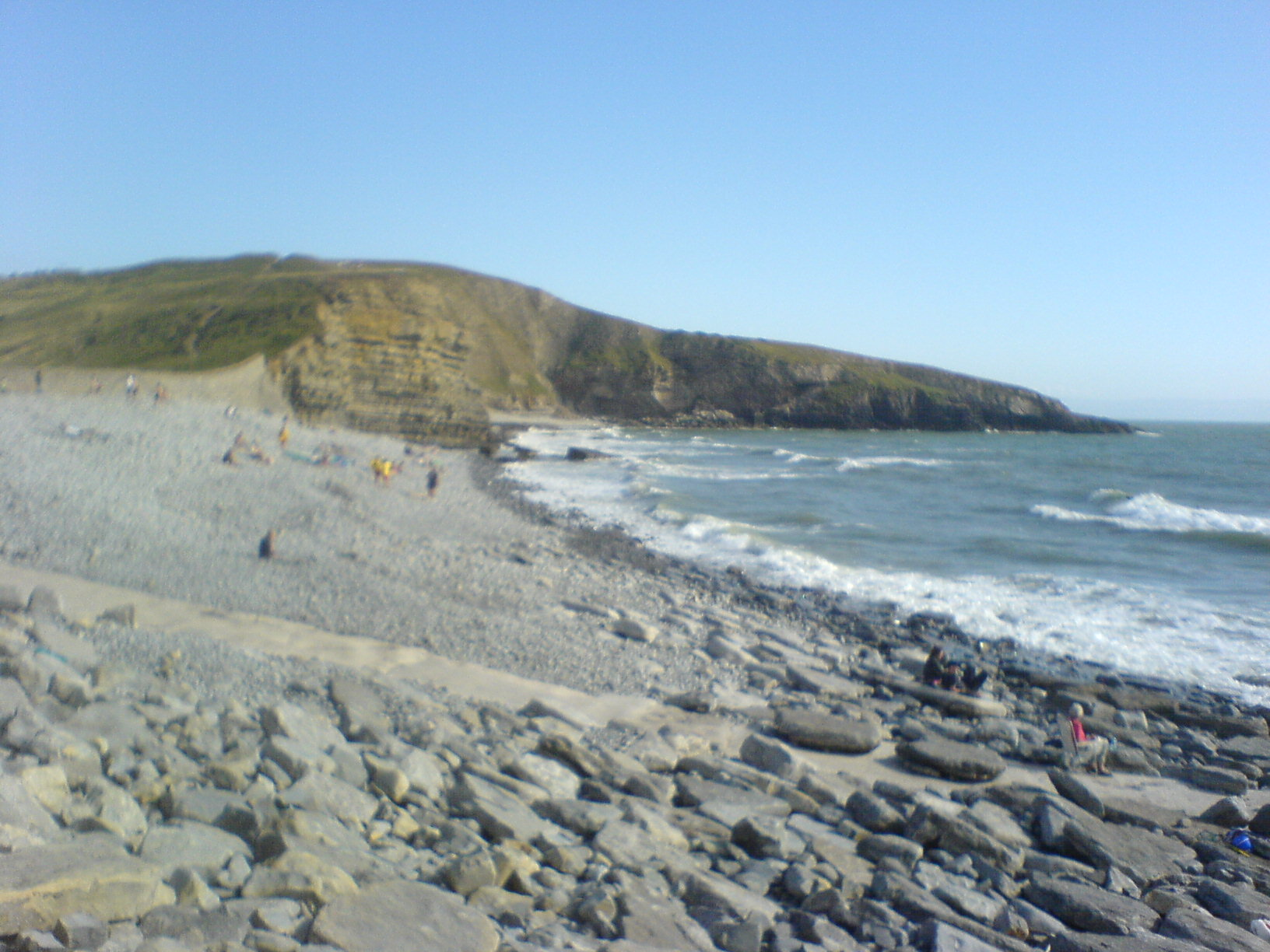
Southerndown Beach

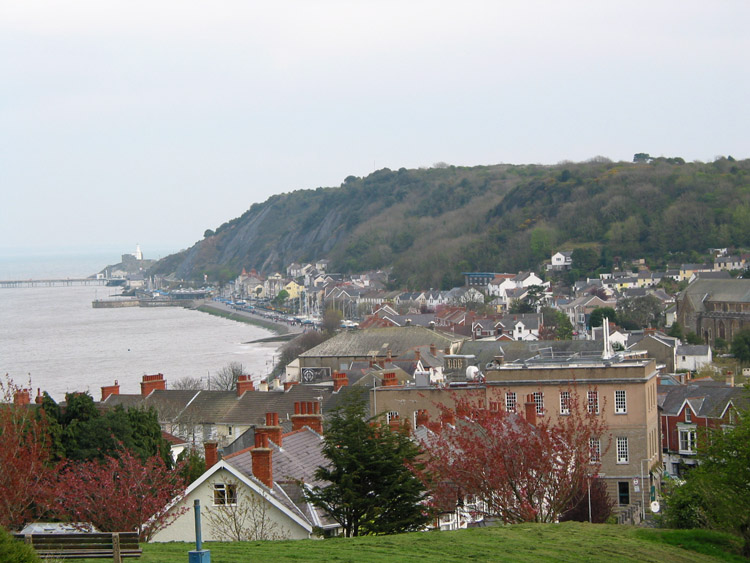
Mumbles Bay

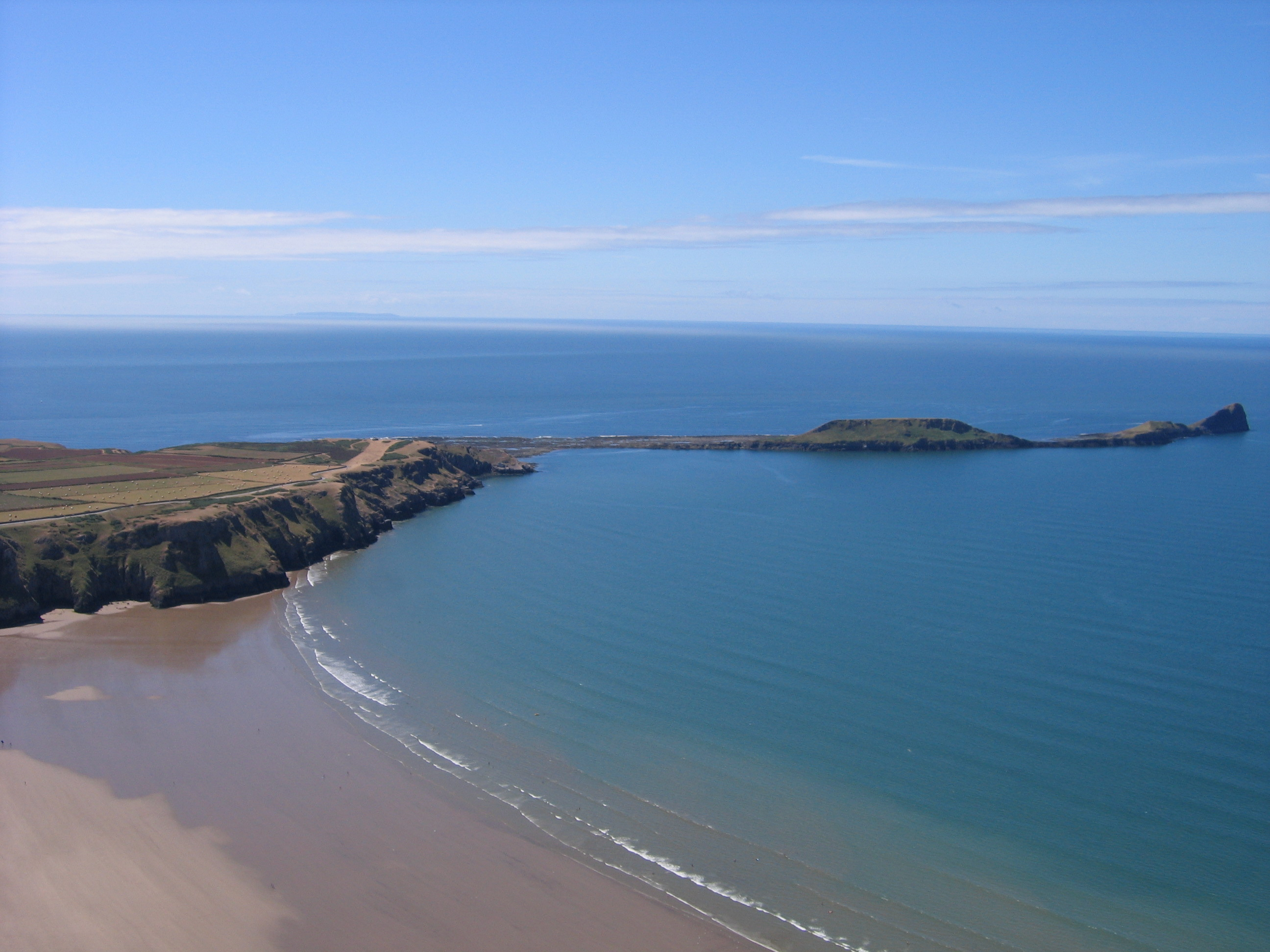
Worm's Head

The coastline remains as steep cliffs until after Dunraven Head, where the cliff face drops away to expose Southerndown Beach. Two miles beyond, the Ogmore River runs out into a sand-locked bay which can be seen as commencing the second section of the Glamorgan coast, as here the scenery undergoes an abrupt change; from a series of unbroken cliffs to vast regions of sandy beaches. The Ogmore Bay at Ogmore-by-Sea was not only floored with sand but was also backed by high and extensive sand dune system, these impressive natural sand features are commonly known as the Merthyr Mawr sand dunes. Beyond the bay the underlying rocks emerge from the sand to form the promontory of Porthcawl Point. Porthcawl town, once possessing a small dock, abandoned the trade in favour of tourism. The coast continues to the north west as a low rocky formation for three miles to Sker Point, after which the sand line begins again, forming an arid wilderness all the way to Port Talbot. Port Talbot was one of the later industrial towns of Glamorgan, and grew out of the medieval village of Aberavon, a settlement built on the banks of the River Afan. To the west of the mouth of the Afan is the new district of Sandfields, built over the holiday dunes of Aberavon beach in the 1950s to house the workforce of Port Talbot Steelworks.

The River Afan commences the wide sweep of Swansea Bay, which from Port Talbot arcs around taking in Baglan Bay, Briton Ferry, Swansea and ending in Mumbles. The whole bay is shut in by high hills and is thickly encircled with sands. Within the bay are two of the major estuaries of Glamorgan; from Port Talbot the first is the River Neath, which is protected by long breakwaters. The second is the Tawe, the central river of Swansea. Beyond the Tawe the bay sweeps for six miles before reaching Mumbles Head, its most westerly point. Mumbles Head is served by Mumbles Lighthouse, which sits on the further of two small islands off the head.

At The Mumbles, the coastline begins its third phase, commencing the wild and rugged cliffs of the Gower. From Mumbles Head to Worm's Head, 20 miles to the west, the coast consists of a series of precipitous cliffs, interrupted by a number of sandy bays. The most notable of the bays include Langland Bay, Caswell Bay, Pwlldu Bay, Three Cliffs Bay and Oxwich Bay. Three Cliffs Bay and the adjoining Oxwich Bay are overlooked by three medieval defences, Pennard Castle, Penrice Castle and Oxwich Castle, all three now ruinous. Oxwich Bay ends in the large wooded promontory of Oxwich Point, which leads west to the beach front villages of Horton and Port Eynon. From Port Eynon Point, a five-mile stretch of wild and impressive cliffs leads to Worm's Head and the western termination of the peninsula. This rock face is pierced in places by caverns, the most notable being Culver Hole a bone cave near Port Eynon Point.

Worm's Head is one of the stand out features of the Glamorgan coastline, a long narrow ledge of limestone, projecting into the sea, ending in a 200-foot high wedge shaped crag; the Head takes its name from its resemblance to a dragon. On the northern side of the Worm's Head is the village and Bay of Rhossili, a westerly facing bay that leads backwards to a series of downs, some of the highest land in the Gower. Rhossili Bay ends in the northern formation of Llangenydd Burrows and the islet of Burry Holms. The final stretch of Glamorgan coastline turns north-east to form the Burry Inlet, a shallow and sand-choked estuary which leads to a tract of salt marshes which stretch to the mouth of the River Loughor. The Loughor forming the border between Glamorgan and Carmarthenshire.

=== Rivers ===
The major rivers of Glamorgan include the Taff, the Ely, the Ogmore, the Neath, Dulais, the Tawe, the Rhymney (which forms the historic boundary with Monmouthshire), and the Loughor (which forms the historic boundary with Carmarthenshire).

== Administration ==
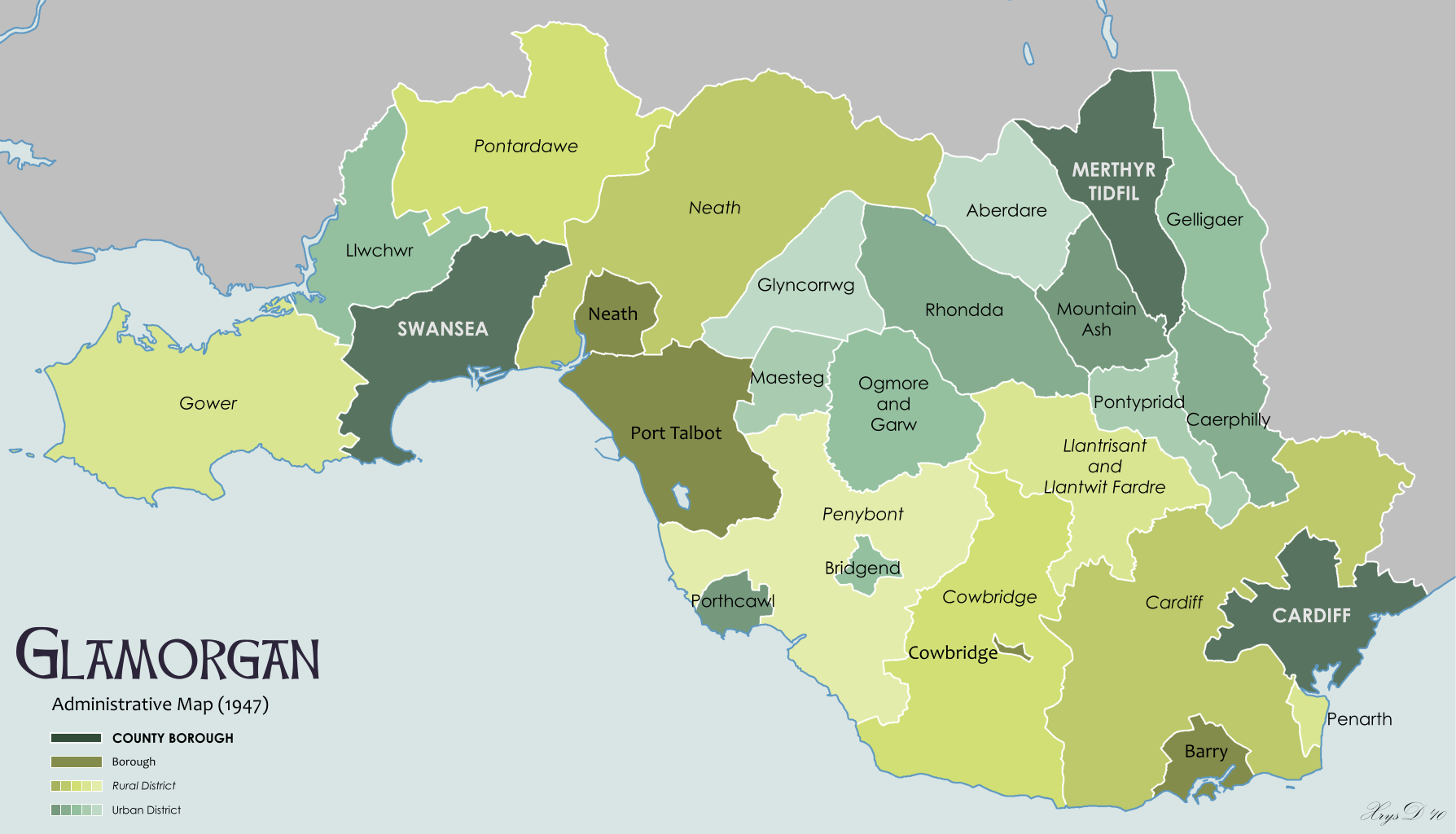
Administrative map (1947) Click on map to enlarge

After the fall of the Welsh kingdom of Morgannwg to Robert FitzHamon in 1091, the region became the English Lordship of Glamorgan, sometimes called the Lordship of Glamorgan and Morgan because it was divided into the Norman settled Plain or Vale of Glamorgan and the Welsh upland area called Morgannwg, anglicised to Morgan. Both areas were under the control of the Norman Lords of Glamorgan (often the Earls of Gloucester). As well as building a military and defensive network, the Normans also undertook an ecclesiastical reorganisation on Glamorgan. In Llandaff there was a small monastic community based on a small church; which was made the headquarters of the diocese, incorporated into the Province of Canterbury. The Diocese of Llandaff covered almost the entirety of Glamorgan and continued throughout the history of the county of Glamorgan, and through to modern times.

In 1536, the Laws in Wales Act 1535 attached the Lordship of Gower and Kilvey to Glamorgan and created the historic county of Glamorgan. Along with gaining parliamentary representation in 1536, Glamorgan became part of the King's circuit, with judges from England administering law at the Great Session or Assizes. Local magistrates were appointed to deal with petty sessions while Lords Lieutenant were appointed as the King's representative. Law enforcement within the confines of the shire was the responsibility of the High Sheriff of Glamorgan.

From the 1790s a call was made for parliamentary reform to address the imbalance between the number of Members of Parliament for each Welsh county and the population each seat represented. Radnorshire had only a tenth of the population of Glamorganshire, though Radnorshire had one MP to Glamorganshire's two (Glamorgan and the District of Cardiff). The First Reform Act (1832) gave five more seats to Wales, three went to Glamorganshire. The Act increased the number of MPs for Glamorganshire from one to two, it created the separate District of Swansea and Merthyr Tydfil became a borough constituency. Reflecting the increased importance and wealth of Merthyr the borough was given a second MP after the Reform Act 1867. However, the 1867 Act had only a limited impact in Glamorgan as the majority of the population lived in the county constituency. Out of 162,241 inhabitants of the county in 1880, only 12,785 had the vote. Conversely, the borough electorate, in Cardiff, Swansea and Merthyr Tydfil had been greatly expanded. This was particularly true of Merthyr where the electorate was increased tenfold to 14,577. As a result, the nonconformist radical, Henry Richard, was returned as senior member for Merthyr, an important watershed in Welsh political history.

In 1884, the county members were the octogenarian C.R.M. Talbot, who had served since 1830 and the Swansea industrialist, Hussey Vivian, first elected in 1857. In 1885, all ten of the Glamorgan seats were captured by the Liberal Party and this election represented the triumph of the nonconformist middle classes. However, the political representation of Glamorgan was transformed between 1884 and 1922. By 1922, the county was represented by eleven Labour MPs. The transformation commenced with the Redistribution of Seats Act 1885. Glamorganshire was split from its two Members of Parliament to five, with the creation of constituencies for East, Mid and South Glamorganshire, Gower and Rhondda. An additional Swansea Town constituency was created, distinct from Swansea District but the Cardiff constituency remained unchanged, and with over 85,000 inhabitants became the largest single-member constituency in the United Kingdom. At this election, all ten members returned for Glamorgan were Liberals, an event which marked the ascendancy of the nonconformist middle-class as a powerful political force. Although most of these seats now had the working-class electorate in a majority they were safe for the Liberals as long as the labour element remained in the Liberal fold.

An administrative county of Glamorgan was created under the Local Government Act 1888, excluding Swansea and Cardiff, which became independent county boroughs. In 1908, county borough status was also granted to Merthyr Tydfil, despite protests from the southern part of the borough, where it was claimed that links were stronger with Pontypridd. In 1935, a Royal Commission argued that Merthyr Tydfil County Borough, then heavily burdened by the cost of maintaining many unemployed people, should be abolished and merged with Glamorgan. The county council refused the proposal.

The first chairman of the County Council was Henry Vivian, 1st Baron Swansea. The county council's coat of arms, granted in 1950, was: Or, three chevronels gules between as many Tudor roses barbed and seeded proper. The red chevronels on a gold shield were the arms of the De Clare Marcher Lords, while the roses recorded the shiring of Glamorgan by Henry VIII. The crest above the shield was a Welsh dragon rising from flames, symbolising the revival of the county's industry following a period of economic depression. The dragon supported a flag bearing a clarion from the arms of the De Granville family, lords of Neath. The supporters of the arms were a coalminer and a steel worker. The motto adopted by the county council: A Ddioddefws A Orfu or 'He Who suffered, conquered' was that of the lineage of Iestyn ap Gwrgant, and was considered appropriate to an area whose wealth depended on great hardship.

Under the Local Government Act 1972, the county boroughs and administrative county of Glamorgan were abolished on 1 April 1974, with three new counties being established, each containing a former county borough: West Glamorgan, Mid Glamorgan, South Glamorgan. It 1996 these areas were reorganised into several unitary authorities by the Local Government Act of 1994. The South Wales Police force covers an area that is similar to Glamorgan. Since 2013, Glamorgan has had its own official flag, red with three white chevrons.

=== Civil parishes ===
Until 1974 Glamorgan was divided into civil parishes, which in the medieval period comprised the following 125 parishes, listed by hundred (with chapelries in italics):

Hundred	Parishes
Caerphilly	Eglwysilan • Gelligaer • Llanfabon/Llanvabon • Merthyr Tudful/Merthyr Tydfil • Yr Ywdre/Rudry • Whitchurch/Yr Eglwys Newydd
Cowbridge	Eglwys Brewys/Eglwys Brewis • Gileston/Silstwn • Llandathan/St Athan • Llandochau/Llandough-juxta-Cowbridge • Llanddunwyd/Welsh St Donats • Llanfaes/Llanmaes • Llanfair/St Mary Church • Llanfihangel-y-bont-faen/Llanmihangel • Llanfihangel y Twyn/Flemingston • Llanfleiddian/Llanblethian (Pontyfon/Cowbridge) • Llanharan • Llanhari/Llanharry • Llanilar/St Hilary • Llanilid • Llanilltud Fawr/Llantwit Major • Llansanwyr/Llansannor • Llyswyrni/Llysworney • Pendeulwyn/Pendoylan • Ystradowain/Ystradowen
Dinas Powis	Bonvilston/Tresimwn • Cadoxton-juxta-Barry/Tregatwg • Cogan • Gwenfô/Wenvoe • Lavernock/Larnog • Lecwydd/Leckwith • Llanbedr-y-fro/Peterston-super-Ely • Llancarfan (Llancatal/Llancadle) • Llandochau Fach/Llandough-juxta-Penarth • Llanfihangel-ar-Elái/Michaelston-super-Ely • Llanfihangel-y-pwll/Michaelston-le-Pit • Llanilltwrn/Llanilltern • Llansanffraid-ar-Elái/St Brides-super-Ely • Llantriddyd/Llantrithyd • Llwyneliddon/St Lythans • Merthyr Dyfan • Penarth • Penmarc/Penmark • Porthceri/Porthkerry • St Andrews Major/Sain Andras • St Fagans/Sain Ffagan • St George-super-Ely/Sain Siorys • St Nicholas/Sain Nicolas • Sully/Sili • Y Barri/Barry
Ceibwr/Kibbor	Caerau • Caerdyf/Cardiff St Mary (Caerdyf/Cardiff St John) • Llandaf/Llandaff • Llanedern/Llanedeyrn • Llanisien/Llanishen • Llysfaen/Lisvane • Y Rhath/Roath
Llangyfelach	Llangyfelach/Llangefelach • Llangiwg/Llanguick • Llansamlet/Llansamled
Miskin	Aberdâr/Aberdare • Llantrisant/Llantrisaint (Talygarn) • Llanilltud Faerdref/Llantwit Fardre • Llanwynno/Llanwonno • Pentyrch • Radur/Radyr • Ystrad Dyfodwg/Ystradyfodwg
Neath	Aberafan/Aberavon • Baglan • Castell-nedd/Neath • Cilybebyll • Cwmafan/Michaelston-super-Avon • Glyncorrwg • Llangatwg/Cadoxton-juxta-Neath • Llanilltud/Llantwit-juxta-Neath • Llansawel/Briton Ferry
Newcastle	Betws/Bettws • Coety/Coity (Nolton) • Cynffig/Kenfig • Laleston/Trelales • Llandudwg/Tythegston • Llangrallo/Coychurch (Llanbedr-ar-Fynydd/Peterston-super-Montem) • Llangynwyd • Llansanffraid-ar-Ogwr/St Bride's Minor • Margam • Maudlam • Newcastle/Y Castell Newydd • Newton Nottage/Drenewydd yn Notais • Nottage/Notais
Ogmore	Colwinston/Tregolwyn • Eglwys Fair y Mynydd/St Mary Hill • Ewenni/Ewenny • Llandyfodwg/Llandyvodog • Llandŵ/Llandow • Llanfrynach • Llanganna/Llangan • Llangeinwyr/Llangeinor • Marcroes/Marcross • Merthyr Mawr • Monknash • St Andrews Minor • St Brides Major/Sant-y-brid • St Donats/Sain Dunwyd • Wick/Y Wig
Swansea	Casllwchwr/Loughor • Cheriton • Llanddewi • Llandeilo Ferwallt/Bishopston • Llandeilo Talybont • Llangenydd/Llangennith • Llanilltud Gwyr/Ilston • Llanmadog/Llanmadoc • Llanrhidian (Llanyrnewydd) • Llan-y-tair-mair/Knelston • Nicholaston • Oxwich • Penmaen • Pennard • Penrhys/Penrice • Port Einon/Port Eynon • Reynoldston • Rhosili/Rhossili • St John-juxta-Swansea • Swansea/Abertawe • Ystumllwynarth/Oystermouth

== Transport ==
=== Roads ===
The earliest forms of transport within Glamorgan were mere paths or trackways linking one settlement to another. With continual use the tracks widened to allow different forms of travel, including the use by pack horses; and as the tracks became more recognisable the first primitive roads came into being. The Romans established a route, Via Julia Maritima, to service their garrisons across South Wales and this is followed largely by the present A48. However, for 1,000 years after the Romans there was little need for major roads. Early roads were not systematically managed, and in Glamorgan as in the rest of Wales, they were in a very poor state. Towards Tudor times the upkeep and repair of the roads came under the administration of each parish, with six days of the week during the summer allowed for track repairs. These repairs were rarely completed and the roadways continued to suffer. The Highways Act 1555 required each landowner to produce a cart, horses or bullocks, and two men to work 4 days on roads. Supervision was by two unpaid surveyors appointed by the parish. By the late 1600s the situation improved as surveyors were appointed by the magistrates, who were allowed to levy a rate to pay for some of the work.

In 1756, after the shire of Glamorgan had come under the rule of the crown, Wales adopted a toll system for the maintenance of the roads; with the governance falling under the control of the turnpike trusts. Further Turnpike Acts came into force in 1799 and 1810, and these Acts allowed trustees to collect a toll for the use of certain roads within a district. In South Wales there were turnpikes along the coast, more or less following the present motorway line, up the Merthyr Valley and across the hills to Abergavenny, Brecon, Llandovery and down to Carmarthen. This system improved travelling conditions, allowing for stage coaches which were then coming into general use. Although the roads improved there were those who felt that the tolls were unjust, and there was a popular uprising between 1839 and 1843 known as the Rebecca Riots where agitators attacked and destroyed the toll houses. Although most of these attacks occurred in Carmarthenshire, there were reports of attacks within Glamorgan, most notably in Swansea. In 1846, county highway boards were established in south Wales, to buy out the turnpike trusts and take over their functions. In 1878 all roads that had ceased to be turnpiked after 1870 were deemed as 'main roads' by the Highways and Locomotives (Amendment) Act 1878. The turnpike system was eventually abolished by the Local Government Act 1888 and the roads were placed under the management of the local county council. County highway boards were disbanded. There were, however, a number of urban areas within Glamorgan that retained the right to control their own highways, and the county council never achieved control of the whole highway network.

Proposals for a high-quality new road across South Wales were first made in the 1930s. However, the dualling of the A48 Neath bypass was only completed in 1960, with the A48(M) Port Talbot bypass following in 1966. The latter road, an early example of dual carriageway construction through a built-up area, was the first length of motorway opened to traffic in Wales. The Ministry of Transport initially envisaged that the new M4 motorway would terminate at Tredegar Park near Newport, with a series of bypasses to improve the A48 further west. The creation of the Welsh Office led to a re-appraisal of policy and a decision to extend the M4 further into Glamorgan. By 1970, the Welsh Office was committed to building a new route all the way to Pont Abraham in Carmarthenshire. The 1960s also saw the construction of the first road across the Heads of the Valleys, with the A465 Neath-Abergavenny trunk road opening in 1964. However, even at the outset there were complaints about the capacity and safety of its single carriageway, three-lane design.

=== Waterways and ports ===
Due to Glamorgan's long coastline, several settlements grew and prospered as harbour and port towns. In 1801, Swansea was Glamorgan's largest urban area with a population five times that of Cardiff's. Cowbridge was the capital town of the Vale, and the centre of agricultural trade, with surplus stock being shipped to the coastal village of Aberthaw and to a lesser extent Newton. Where there were breaks in the rocky coastline, small fishing and cockling communities existed, such as Port Eynon and Penclawdd.

The event that changed the face of coastal Glamorgan was the growth of the Merthyr iron industry. Merthyr needed a coastal export point for its iron and Cardiff was the obvious choice being at the mouth of the River Taff. A road was built to connect the two towns, but with only horses to move the cargo, transportation was cumbersome; therefore an alternative was planned. Although Glamorgan had a large number of rivers, few were navigable for any considerable length. Between 1790 and 1794, acts of Parliament were obtained for the construction of three canals within Glamorgan, the Glamorganshire Canal (1790), Neath Canal (1791) and the Swansea Canal (1794). All three were vital in increasing the transportation of iron, copper, steel and coal from the uplands of the county to the ports at Swansea and Cardiff. Although the first stages of all three canals were completed by 1800 and revolutionised the commercial transportation systems of Glamorgan; in 1804 at Penydarren Ironworks, Richard Trevithick's "Pen-y-Darren" locomotive became the first engine to pull a load along rails; heralding the coming of the railways, which would eventually replace the canals.

The port at Cardiff grew quickly during the 19th century, not as a mass exporter of iron but of coal, transported from Pontypridd and the Cynon and Rhondda Valleys. From 1840 to 1870 Cardiff's export tonnage of coal increased from 44,350 to 2,219,000. By 1871, Cardiff had outgrown all of its Welsh rivals to become the most populous town in the country Swansea Docks continued to be the world's leading exporter of copper, but did not experience the growth of Cardiff due to poor links to the coalfields. Ambitious attempts were made to link Swansea's docks to coal rich areas, such as the Rhondda and Swansea Bay Railway, but these plans were never truly economically successful. The biggest threat to Cardiff's dominance came in the early 20th century at Barry. In 1881, Barry had 484 inhabitants, after an 1884 act of Parliament authorising the construction of a docks and railway link, the town grew to over 27,000 by 1901. The chief advocate of Barry's growth as a dock was David Davies, and in 1901 Barry was exporting more coal than Cardiff, peaking in 1913 when it shipped 11.41 million tons.

The interwar depression experienced by Great Britain brought an end to the prosperity of the Glamorgan ports. During the Second World War, the main ports of Glamorgan were heavily targeted by German bombing raids, though exports were not severely disrupted. By the second half of the 20th century none of the county's docks showed any growth, and with the collapse of the coal trade in South Wales Cardiff and Barry Docks became near derelict, shipping mainly general cargo. Swansea also suffered a vast reduction on trade with the end of the area as a world leader in copper smelting. The only dock to remain a viable exporter was the Port of Port Talbot. First built in 1839, the docks at Port Talbot were a minor concern in relation to the more established ports, but exports increased after the 1916 with the completion of the Margam Steelworks. Exports continued strongly when the Abbey Works were built in 1952. Port Talbot would eventually become the biggest exporting port in Glamorgan, and the second largest in Wales, only surpassed by Milford Haven.

=== Rail ===
Before the use of locomotives, railway track was used at various stages of the canal system to link locations to which the waterways could not reach. These wagons on these tramlines would be pulled by horse over wooden rails, which later were replaced by wrought iron. In 1809 Richard Griffiths built a private tram-road to the Glamorganshire Canal from his coal mine in Gyfeillion. The Gyfeillion site was extended further in 1811 to link Walter Coffin's mine at Dinas Rhondda, allowing the first viable transport link from the Rhondda coal fields to the ports of Cardiff.

The first railway network to be built in Glamorgan, the Taff Vale Railway, was also the first in Wales. Linking the ironworks of Merthyr to the ports of Cardiff, the Taff Vale line was given royal assent in 1836, with work commencing the same year. It was completed in 1840, and as well as carrying goods the trains made limited passenger trips from the very beginning. By 1856 the Taff Vale Railway was extended to service the top of the Rhondda Valleys at Treherbert and Maerdy, which allowed the exploitation of the minefields in one of the most coal-rich areas of Britain. The second major railway to open was the South Wales Railway, linking Gloucester in England to Neyland. The line was designed to link the coalfields of Glamorgan to London, and was also part of Isambard Kingdom Brunel's vision of a transport link from London to New York. The South Wales Railway serviced Cardiff, Bridgend, Neath and Swansea, with its final destination within Glamorgan being Loughor, before continuing through Carmarthenshire. Other railway lines that opened during the mid to late 19th century included the Vale of Neath Railway, the Swansea Vale Railway and the Rhymney Railway; all designed with the primary purpose of transporting metals and coal from the uplands of the county to the ever-expanding ports. The cargo carried on these lines was of a very high volume, and in 1850 the Taff Vale Railway was transporting 600,000 tons of coal per annum.

Towards the turn of the 19th century, two notable events occurred connected to the Taff Vale Railway. In 1888, the Barry Railway Company was formed as part of David Davies' plan to create an alternative export port in south Wales at Barry Docks. As a threat to the monopoly of the TVR, the plans were heavily contested in Parliament, and more parliamentary time was spent on the Barry bill than on any other railway bill in British history. The second event saw the Taff Vale Railway Strike of 1900, an event that saw the House of Lords, in the Taff Vale Case, deem trade unions accountable for the financial losses caused by strike action. The need to reverse the decision was a central factor in the creation of the British Labour Party.

In the 20th century, the railways saw a gradual drop in usage as the heavy industrial works and mines began to reduce output and close and many stations became redundant. Following the Second World War, the railways were nationalised in 1948. In the 1960s the main line services in Wales underwent dieselisation, but this modernisation failed to save the rail system and by 1968 many passenger lines were discontinued by the Beeching Axe.

=== Airports ===
Glamorgan was served by several airports and airfields, with Cardiff Airport being the county's chief airport. Cardiff Airport grew from a former RAF station built in 1942 at Rhoose, and was originally known as Rhoose Airport. In 1970 it became 'Glamorgan, Rhoose Airport' before becoming 'Cardiff-Wales airport' in the 1980s.

Glamorgan's second commercial airport was Swansea Airport which also began as an RAF station, before being released to commercial usage in 1956. The airport saw varying degrees of success until regular flights ceased in 1969. Several other airports and aerodromes have serviced Glamorgan, but usually for private flights. The most notorious aviation disaster in Wales occurred in Glamorgan in 1950, when a privately hired Avro Tudor crashed at Llandow Aerodrome. The Llandow air disaster was, at the time, the world's worst aviation disaster.

== Culture and recreation ==
=== Sport ===
Sport was an important part of life in Glamorgan, and the county produced several individuals and teams of note. One of the first recorded team sports in Wales was bando, a variant of bandy. The game was very popular in Glamorgan between the eighteenth and nineteenth centuries before losing in popularity to rugby football. The most notable team to carry the name Glamorgan, is Glamorgan County Cricket Club. Although cricket had been established in Glamorgan since the creation of Cardiff Cricket Club in 1819; county team Glamorgan CCC did not form until 1888. The team gained first-class status in 1921, and still play under the name of Glamorgan. In the first hundred years, the only Welshman to captain an England major tour abroad was Tony Lewis, Glamorgan captain 1967–72.

The other bat and ball team sport of note in the area was baseball, which was very popular in Cardiff, reaching its peak in the 1930s.

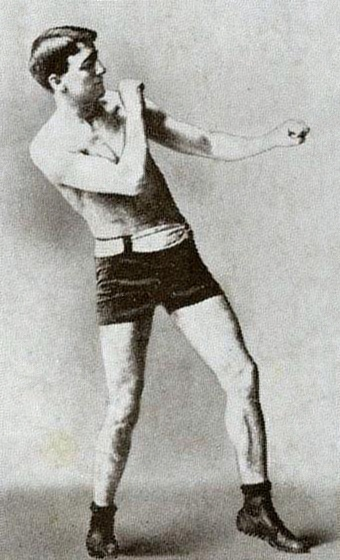
Freddie Welsh, one of several World title boxing Champions to come from Glamorgan

One of the most popular sports in Glamorgan was rugby union, producing some of the oldest rugby clubs in the world. Swansea RFC, Cardiff RFC and Merthyr RFC were founding members of the Welsh Rugby Union in 1881, and both St. Helen's Rugby and Cricket Ground (Swansea) and the Cardiff Arms Park (Cardiff), have been sporting venues for international rugby. Like cricket, rugby union was also played at county level, with Glamorgan represented by Glamorgan County RFC, an invitational team which faced the likes of the All Blacks and the Springboks in the early part of the 20th century. Other rugby clubs of note from the region include Bridgend RFC, Glamorgan Wanderers RFC, Neath RFC and Pontypridd RFC. Although never finding any lasting appeal within Glamorgan, a number of rugby league teams emerged in the early 1900s; and on 1 January 1908, the first true international rugby league game took place in Aberdare between Wales and New Zealand.

As well as rugby and cricket, association football was a very popular sport in Glamorgan, producing two teams with a long tradition in British football, Swansea City (formed 1912 as Swansea Town A.F.C.) and Cardiff City (formed 1899 as Riverside AFC). Both clubs played in the English football league system, rather than the Welsh leagues, though Cardiff were more successful during this period, spending 15 seasons in the First Division and winning the FA Cup in 1927. Other teams of note include Merthyr Tydfil F.C. (1945), who have won the Welsh Cup on three occasions.

Of all the individual sports, boxing was perhaps Glamorgan's most prolific. From the northern coalfields and ironworks a string of world class boxers were produced, which was later matched by notable fighters from Cardiff. Of note were Rhondda's Percy Jones (World Flyweight Champion), Tom Thomas (British Middleweight Champion), Jimmy Wilde (World Flyweight Champion) and Tommy Farr (Empire Heavyweight Champion); Merthyr's Eddie Thomas (European Welterweight Champion) and Howard Winstone (European Featherweight Champion); Pontypridd's Freddie Welsh (World Lightweight Champion) and Frank Moody (Empire Middleweight Champion). From Cardiff came 'Peerless' Jim Driscoll (British Featherweight Champion) and Jack Petersen (British Heavyweight Champion). Other fighters of note include Dai Dower (European Flyweight Champion) from Abercynon and Bill Beynon (Empire Bantamweight Champion) from Taibach.

=== Tourism ===
Glamorgan, and Wales, were never exploited as a tourist destination until the late 18th century. The destination of choice for English gentlemen during the period was the Grand Tour, but after conflicts in mainland Europe, British travellers looked for 'wild' destinations within their own country. These first tourists were important archivists in their writings, paintings and sketches but there was no real tourist trade to receive them. The coming of industrialisation in the early 19th century gave rise to a new prosperous middle-class and improved communications; both led to a burgeoning tourist trade. The late 19th century, with improving rail links, saw the coastal areas of Glamorgan that benefited from a beachfront grow as tourist destinations. These towns, most notably Barry Island, Porthcawl, Aberavon and Mumbles, owed their existence as tourist locations to the development of the south Wales coal field and the introduction of the workers' annual holidays. By the mid 20th century these locations improved the number of visitors they could accommodate with the introduction of caravan parks and chalet parks.

As the 20th century progressed, and people's leisure activities extended beyond a once-a-year weeks holiday, the county responded with county parks, museums, art galleries and activity centres.

== See also ==
- List of Lord Lieutenants of Glamorgan
- List of Custodes Rotulorum of Glamorgan
- List of High Sheriffs of Glamorgan
- Glamorgan (UK Parliament constituency)
- Glamorgan County Cricket Club
- University of Glamorgan
- Glamorgan Bird Club
