= Gower Ornithological Society =

Birdwatching organisation in Wales

- Founded: 1956
- Type: Registered Charity number 1119472
- Purpose: birdwatching, surveys, conservation, ringing projects, publishing papers and articles
- Location: Swansea
- Region served: Gower, Swansea, Neath and Port Talbot
- Method: education, field trips, indoor meetings
- Members: 300
- Website: www.gowerBirds.org.uk

The Gower Ornithological Society is a society for professional and amateur birdwatchers covering the geographical areas of south Wales comprising Gower, Swansea, Neath and Port Talbot.

== Foundation and membership ==
The Gower Ornithological Society was founded in 1956 and offers a programme of meetings for birdwatchers in the areas mentioned above. The society has its own website on which members and friends are encouraged to post sightings of birds in the recording area.

The emblem of the society is an oystercatcher in flight with Whiteford Lighthouse in the background. The society’s membership has grown to about 300 members, but it has remained a friendly and active society.

The membership secretary of the society is currently Jeremy Douglas-Jones. The society also has a chairman, secretary, and treasurer. There are also two recorders of bird sightings, one for west Glamorgan and another for east Glamorgan.

== Aims and objectives ==
The aim of the society is to promote the conservation of wild birds and help people to learn about birds.

The society also records the numbers and species of birds in the area for its annual report called Gower Birds. This report has been published annually since 1968.

The society also produces a regular newsletter and produces a checklist of birds and works with many other conservation organisations. Many members carry out national bird surveys for organisations such as the British Trust for Ornithology and the Wildfowl and Wetlands Trust.

The society also undertakes local surveys of garden, coastal, wetland and breeding birds.

Some members also carry out bird ringing projects and publish papers and articles about birds.

== Events and activities ==
Indoor meetings are held on the fourth Friday of the month from September to March in St Pauls Parish Centre, De la Beache Road, Sketty, Swansea SA2 9AR at 7.15pm. Field trips are arranged for members and visitors.

Details of events can be found on the society’s web site and Swansea’s ‘What’s On’ guide, or by emailing the society.

== Bird recording ==
The Society produces Gower Birds (Adar Gwyr, in Welsh) once a year. This is a check-list of the birds recorded in the area. Records are collated by the Society Recorder, who can be contacted through the Society, and are sought for: all rare and scarce species; any new records; all breeding records; bird counts: waders and wildfowl, wintering flocks, gull roosts, migrating birds, seabird numbers of common species; details of ringed birds; escapes and releases, with any notes that may be relevant to their origin, such as coloured leg rings, jesses, etc. and anything else of interest. Records should be submitted via Bird Track or Excel spreadsheet or on record cards, these are available from the Society & County Recorder. As a minimum, an appropriate level of description and/or photographs should be submitted on, or attached to, the record card or e-mail.

Local and scarce bird records for the area include: black-throated diver, red-necked grebe, sooty shearwater, Balearic shearwater, Leach's storm-petrel, spoonbill, pink-footed goose, garganey, European honey buzzard, red grouse, dotterel, wood sandpiper, grey phalarope, pomarine skua, long-tailed skua, Sabine’s gull, ring-billed gull, yellow-legged gull, Iceland gull, roseate tern, black guillemot, little auk, long-eared owl, hoopoe, wryneck, waxwing, yellow-browed warbler, golden oriole, great grey shrike, twite and snow bunting.

Records submitted to the County Recorder are then considered by the relevant records committee: the British Birds Rarities Committee (BBRC) or the Welsh Records Panel (WRP). The Society does not publish records of any species regarded as British rarities on the list of the BBRC unless the record has been considered and accepted by the BBRC. Records should be sent to the County Recorder as soon as possible after the sighting.

There is also a blog, established for interesting bird, and other wildlife sightings, from Gower, Swansea, Neath and Port Talbot, called Gower Wildlife.

== Future work ==
Future work includes:

- Improving identification skills
- Carrying out surveys for new National and Local Bird Atlases
- Learning about the work of other conservation organisations
- Supporting local conservation projects
