= Llyn Fawr =

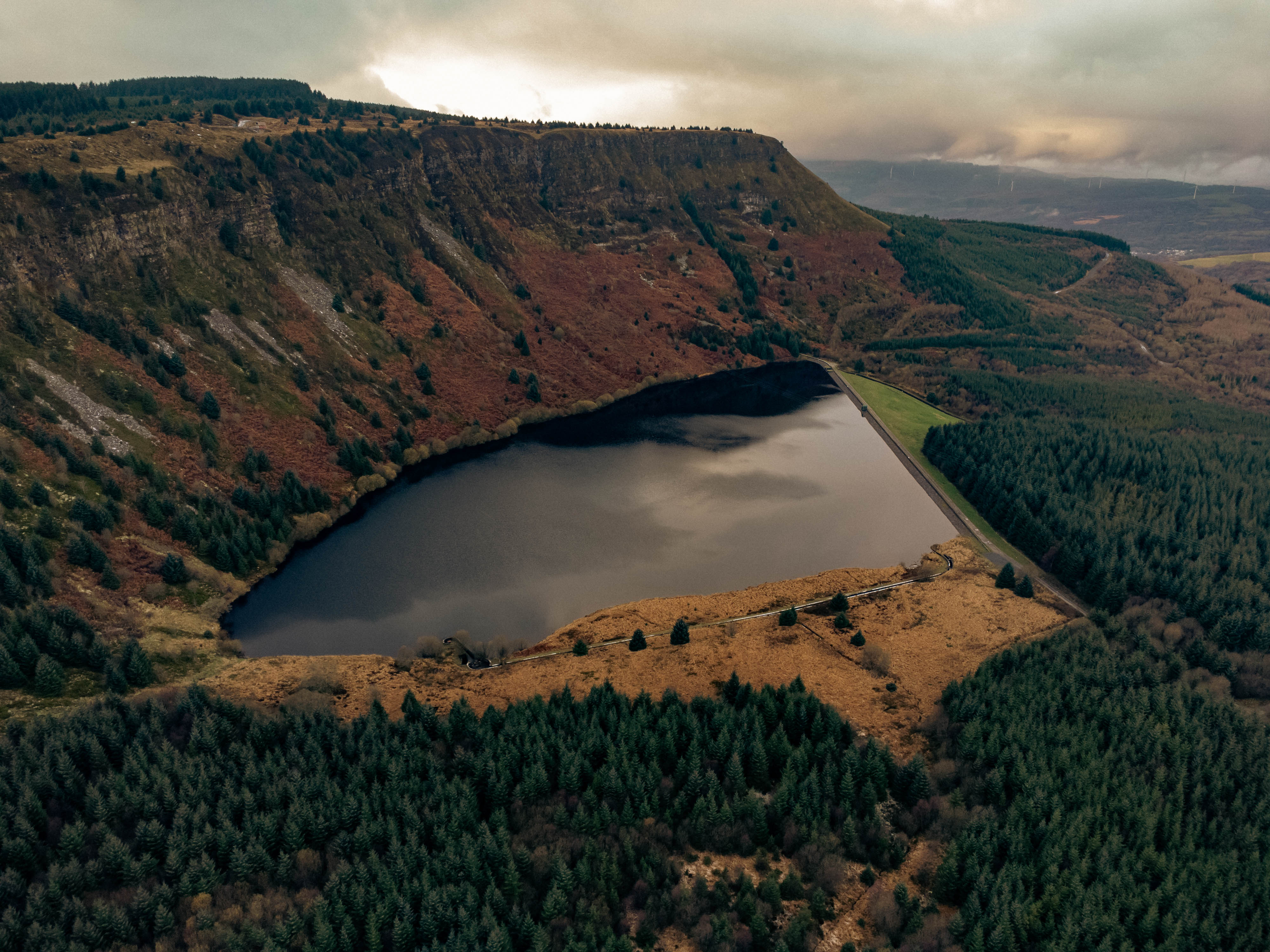

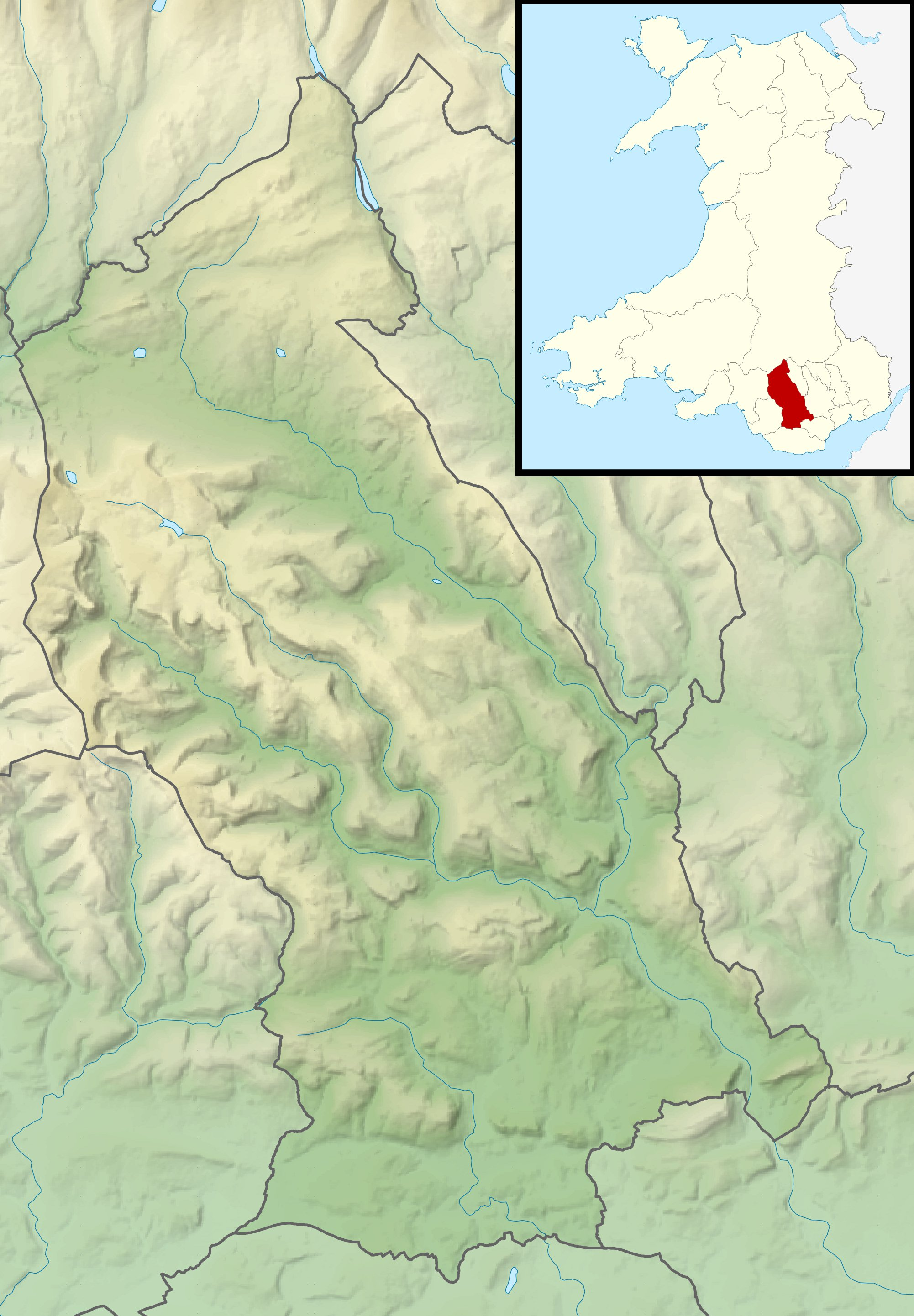
- Location within Rhondda Cynon Taf
- Location: Rhigos, South Wales Valleys, Wales
- Coordinates: 51°43′11″N 3°34′6″W
- Lake type: natural lake, reservoir
- Basin countries: United Kingdom
- Surface area: 9.8 ha (24 acres)
- Surface elevation: 368 m (1,207 ft)

Llyn Fawr ('large lake' in Welsh) is a reservoir that occupies one of a series glacial cirques that form the northern escarpment of the South Wales Coalfield uplands, overlooking the heads of the Vale of Neath and the Cynon Valley, South Wales. It is known as the site of an important hoard of weapons and tools from the late Bronze Age and early Iron Age.

It lies on the northern flanks of Craig-y-Llyn, a mountain that is designated as a Site of Special Scientific Interest. The western cirque contains Llyn Fach ('small lake'). While in government terms, it falls in the unitary authority of Rhondda Cynon Taf, in geographic terms it is actually in the Vale of Neath and its excess waters (all its water before conversion) flow into Nant Gwrelych, which flows into the River Neath at Pont Walby near Glynneath. Less than 1 km to the southeast and south lie the headwaters of the Rhondda Fawr and Rhondda Fach rivers, while 1.5 km to the southwest lie the headwaters of River Corrwg.

== Drinking water reservoir ==
Owing to its rapid and massive industrialisation during its coalfield boom (population increasing from 951 in 1851 to 113,735 in 1901), the Rhondda Valley, which lies on the south side of the escarpment, surpassed the supply of water it could source from its own river, so in 1909 the Water Works division of Rhondda Urban District Council contracted builders to convert Llyn Fawr into a reservoir. Originally having an area of 11.927 acres (0.048 km^{2}), the lake was expanded, by the construction of a 25-foot high embankment dam and deepening of lake bed, to give a total storage volume of 200,000,000 gallons (909 megalitres). With work completed in 1913 giving the new lake a surface area of 21.616 acres (0.087 km^{2}), which then was increased again to 24.75 acres (0.100 km^{2}) sometime before 1970s. The raw water supply then being pumped through a 1.25-mile long tunnel under Craig-y-Llyn to Ty'n-y-waun water treatment works, in Tynewydd, Rhondda. This tunnel is still a critical part of Welsh Water's infrastructure, supplying the majority of the water supply for the Rhondda valley. Although it is subsiding due to collapsing coal working below, with water now pooling in the middle, investigation is being made into ways to either stabilise it or replace it.

== Bronze age hoard ==
It was during the deepening of the lake that the Llyn Fawr Hoard was discovered between 1909 and 1912. It contains many objects from the late Bronze Age, but also a number of iron objects, notably an iron sword of the Hallstatt type. Two other iron implements were found – a spear and a socketed sickle. Bronze items included two cauldrons and axeheads. The items appear to have been placed in the lake as votive offerings. The date of these items is uncertain because of the context of the finds, but the sword is thought to date from about 650 BC. It is the earliest iron object to have been discovered in Wales. The hoard gave its name to the Llyn Fawr Phase, which is the last phase of the Bronze Age in Britain. The hoard is now in the possession of Amgueddfa Cymru – Museum Wales.

== Bibliography ==
- Frances Lynch, Stephen Aldhouse-Green & Jeffrey L. Davies (2000) Prehistoric Wales (Sutton Publishing) ISBN 0-7509-2165-X
