= Church of the Holy Cross, Cowbridge =

Coordinates: 51.4609°N 3.4483°W

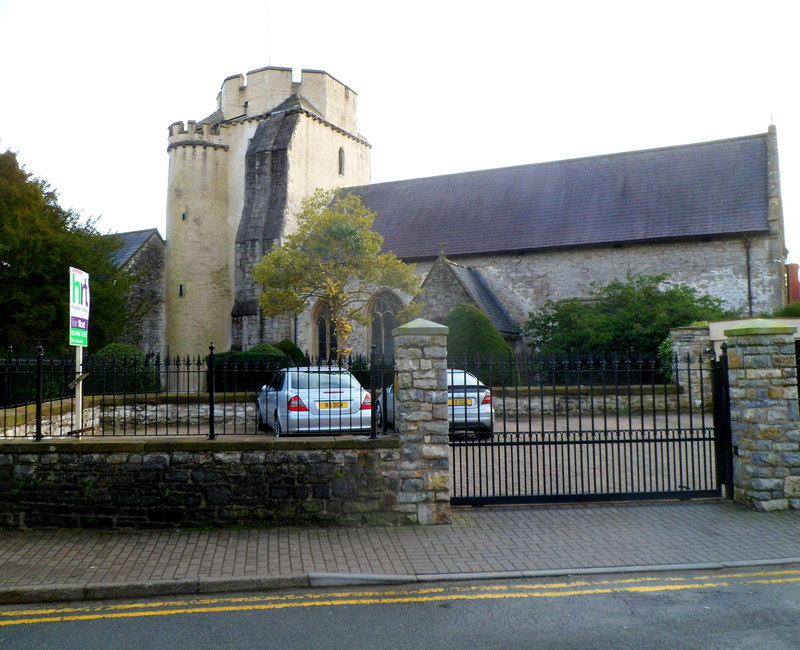
- Church of the Holy Cross

- Location in Vale of Glamorgan
- Location: Cowbridge, Vale of Glamorgan
- Country: Wales
- Denomination: Church in Wales
- Website: Church of the Holy Cross

History
- Founded: 13th century

Architecture
- Heritage designation: Grade I
- Architectural type: Church
- Style: Medieval

The Church of the Holy Cross is a medieval church in Cowbridge in the Vale of Glamorgan, south Wales. Initially a chapel of ease to Church of St John the Baptist, Llanblethian of Cowbridge as a medieval market town. Believed to have been built in the 13th century, the church has an unusual tower design. It has undergone several restorations including one by John Prichard in 1850–52. The Church of the Holy Cross was listed as a Grade I building on 12 May 1963.

== History ==
The church is thought to have been built as part of the construction of the medieval town in Cowbridge during the late 13th century. Although at first a chapel of ease for Llanblethian, Holy Cross was built on a large scale. The church was remodeled throughout the medieval period reflecting the growing prosperity of the town. Its initial build consisted of a tower between a chancel and a wide aisleless nave. The tower once consisted of a 14th-century spire, but this was destroyed by lightning in 1480. (Note: The tower was built with wood framing covered with lead. The cracks on the upper portion of the tower cannot be accounted for except for being due to a lightning strike.) In the 15th century an aisle, known as the south Llanquian aisle, was added to the nave, and a north chapel to the chancel. There is a belief that these additions were gifted by Lady Anne Neville, heiress to the lordship of Glamorgan and wife of Richard, Duke of Gloucester, later King Richard III of England. Newman states that this is based on "dubious documentary evidence". The first organ at the church was a gift from Jasper Tudor, who made similar gifts to other parish churches.

It was recorded in 1721 that the walls of the tower had decayed timbers and frames. In addition the four bells in the tower were broken and cracked. The town of Cowbridge was desirous of having a set of eight bells instead of the four now possessed by the church. The town's revenues were mortgaged to pay for the re-casting of the four broken church bells and the addition of four new ones. In 1848 a charitable call was made by the church for necessary "re-pewing and re-paving", with a target of £250 requested, much of the money coming from wealthy parishioners. That same year some chancel windows were re-opened and glazed by Edward Haycock. Between 1850 and 1852 the church underwent a substantial renovation to the sum of £1,800, contracted to John Prichard of Cardiff. (Note: Prichard's plans for his work included the restoration of the spire destroyed in 1480. The architect wrote in his report to the diocese, "Remote tho' the prospect may be yet I hope to live to see the Tower crowned with a Spire such as I have shown in my drawings.") In 1893 the west gallery was removed and the tower renovated, with further work conducted in both the 1920s and 1930s. Altar rails were added by George Pace in 1965.

The church was listed as a Grade I building on 12 May 1963, cited as being a "medieval church on key site in historic town centre", and having a "group value with surrounding listed buildings".

== Architecture ==
The church is built of coursed local limestone along with local white Sutton stone dressings.

One of the more striking features of the church is the tower. The tower has a corbelled wall head from which angle broaches slope up to an octagonal battlemented top section. Although it has been argued that the original purpose of the tower was to be a watchtower or stronghold in case the town was attacked, Newman argues that the lack of arrow loops rules out its purpose as a defensive fortification. To the tower's northeast is stair turret and to the south side a buttressing mass.

The interior of the tower houses arches on the east and west sides, both part of the original 13th century design. In the chancel the only original feature is the piscina of Sutton stone. There are piers in the English West Country style, which are described as being crude, with awkward fitting between the piers and arches. There are two hatches in the east wall, assumed for the dispensing of alms, which Newman describes as 'a most unusual feature'.

The font is a plain octagonal bowl which tapers down to a roll moulding, it is believed to be 14th century. The stained glass windows of the eastern side of the chancel depict the life of Christ (1868). The south chancel windows depicts Biblical stories of instruction to commemorate one of the headmasters of Cowbridge Grammar School.

== Primary sources ==
- Cowbridge Record Society (2001). Llanblethian Buildings & People. Cowbridge: Cowbridge Record Society. ISBN 0953702928.
- Hopkin-James, Lemuel J. (1922). Old Cowbridge, borough, church, and school. Illustrated by Mrs. Adelaide Williams and others. Cardiff: Educational Pub. Co. hdl:2027/uc2.ark:/13960/t2s46kq12.
- Davies, John; Jenkins, Nigel; Menna, Baines; Lynch, Peredur I., eds. (2008). The Welsh Academy Encyclopaedia of Wales. Cardiff: University of Wales Press. ISBN 978-0-7083-1953-6.
- Newman, John (1995). Glamorgan. London: Penguin Group. ISBN 0140710566.
- Gunter, Maud (1961). "The Manor of Llanblethian". In Williams, Stewart (ed.). The Garden of Wales. Barry: Stewart Williams Publishers.
