= Robert Williams (architect) =

Welsh architect and social campaigner (1848–1918)

- Born: 27 January 1848; Ystradowen, Glamorgan, Wales
- Died: 16 October 1918 (aged 70); Cairo, Khedivate of Egypt
- Burial place: Protestant Cemetery, Cairo
- Occupation: Architect
- Notable work: Cowbridge Girls School, South Glamorgan (1895–96); Wheatsheaf Hall, London (1896)
- Spouses: Margaret Griffiths (d. by 1881); Elizabeth Ann Kettle (1883-?)
- Children: Two

Robert Williams (27 January 1848 – 16 October 1918) was a Welsh architect and social campaigner. Born in South Wales, he studied architecture in London and established a practice there in 1887. Williams' work showed a Gothic Revival influence and included public and educational buildings in Wales and London including the Wheatsheaf Hall and Cowbridge Girls School. From 1914 he practised in Egypt, constructing Cairo's largest shop for the Davies Bryan Company, as well as a number of other commercial and public buildings.

Williams was a member of the Independent Labour Party and sat on the executive committees of the Land Nationalisation Society and the London Reform Union. He was elected a London County Council councillor in 1901 and advocated for more stringent housing standards. Williams wrote several books on housing and advocated for internal toilets at a time when outdoor privies were the norm. His daughter Margaret Travers Symons was also a social campaigner and suffragette.

== Early life and British architecture ==
Williams was born in Ystradowen, Glamorgan, on 27 January 1848. He was the second son of a carpenter, Rees Williams, and his wife Mary (née Evans). He was educated at the Eagle Academy, a private school on Eagle Lane, Cowbridge. He received training at his father's office and workshops before being apprenticed to a building contractor. From 1873 he attended the South Kensington School of Art to study architecture and the construction of buildings; he won several school prizes and a national medal. Rather than being articled to an architect's design office Williams took the unusual route into the profession of becoming a site-based clerk of works. He worked for James Piers St Aubyn and then for Maurice Bingham Adams, including on the improvements to Blickling Hall made for Schomberg Kerr, 9th Marquess of Lothian in the 1880s and 1890s. Afterwards he worked for Waller, Son & Wood of Gloucester.

Williams was married to Margaret Griffiths and the couple had two children, Inigo Rees (born in Llantrisant in 1876) and Margaret Ann (born in Paddington in 1879). By 1881, when Williams was living in Coggeshall in Essex, his wife had died. He remarried in 1883 to Elizabeth Ann Kettle, at Braintree.

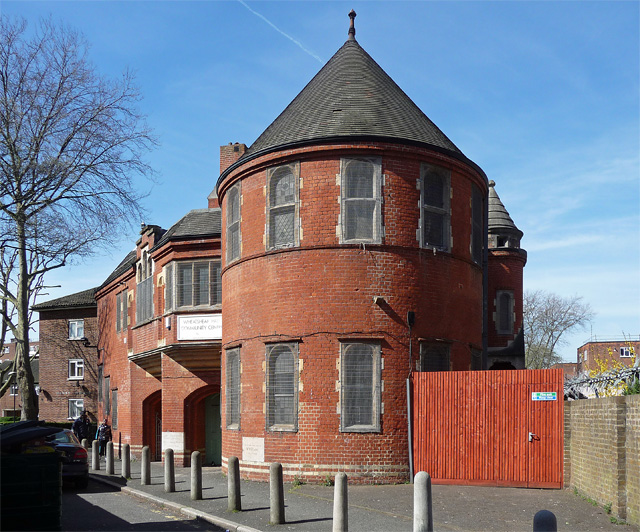
Wheatsheaf Hall

By 1887 Williams was living in Haslemere, Surrey. On 7 November he was admitted as an associate to the Royal Institute of British Architects (RIBA), allowing him to set up his own architectural practice in London. Williams's main work was in public structures and educational institutions. He carried out several commissions in his native South Wales, including Pontypool Market Hall (1893–94), Cowbridge Girls School (1895–96) (Note: The former Cowbridge Girls School was demolished in 2024 to make way for a housing development.) and Pontypool and District Hospital (1903). (Note: The Pontypool and District Hospital buildings were demolished in the early 2000s.) Works in London include the Wheatsheaf Hall, Vauxhall (1896) and the People's Hall, West Kensington (1901). His work shows a Gothic Revival influence, though with a particular focus on comfort, convenience and sanitation.

Williams became a fellow of RIBA in 1896, by which time he was living in Harringay, London. Williams was also a member of the Cambrian Archaeological Association and drew sketches of their 1897 investigations in Cardiganshire, that were published in Archaeologia Cambrensis and The Builder. He campaigned for conservation of historic buildings, complaining in the local press about unsympathetic modifications and new-builds. He was also an early proponent for a national school of architecture in Wales, an objective achieved two years after his death. By 1905 he resided in Fleet Street, London, and in 1914 he was at Hook in Hampshire.

== Social campaigning ==
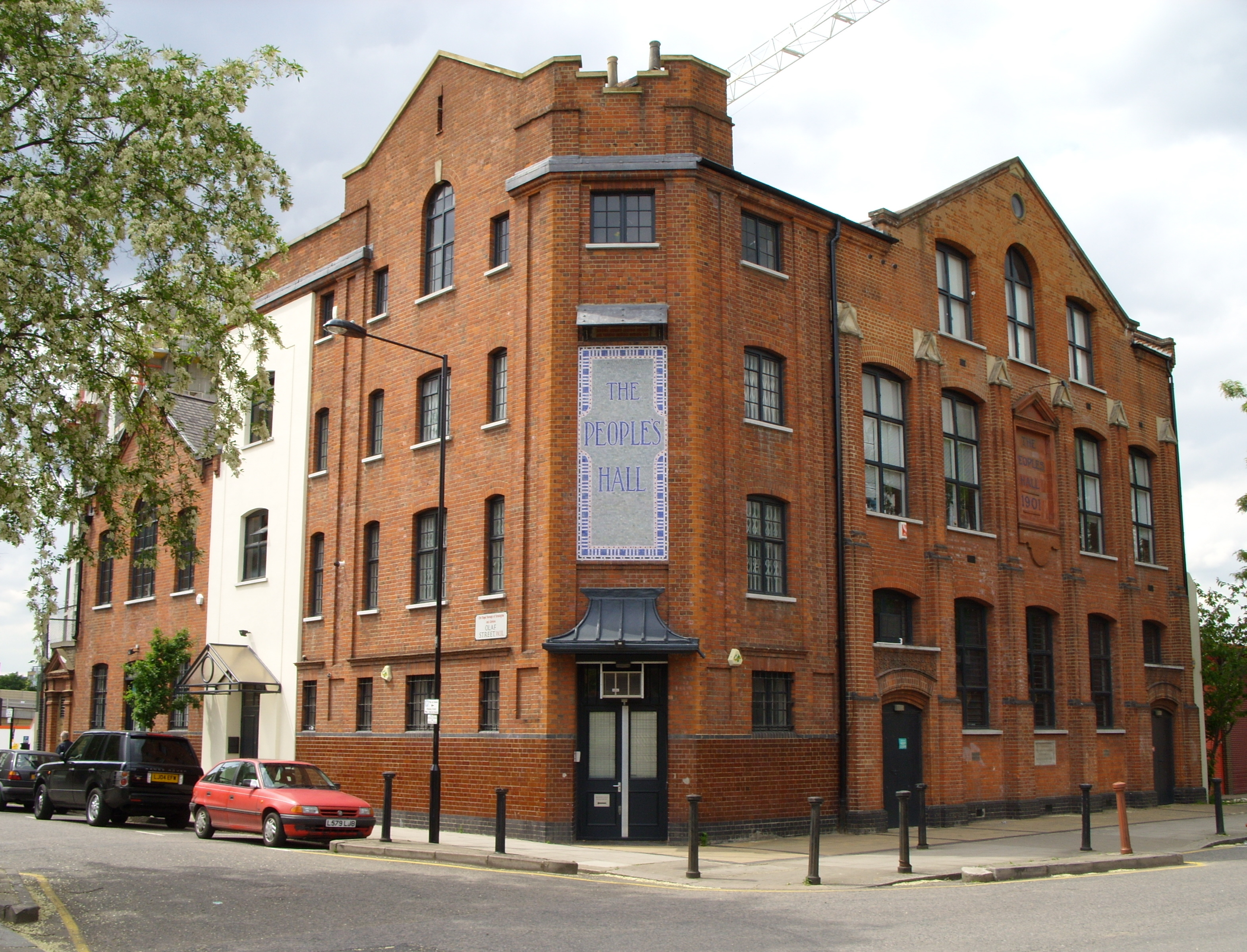
The People's Hall, West Kensington

Williams was a fervent socialist and counted left-leaning politicians Keir Hardie and Frank Smith as friends. Williams's daughter, Margaret Travers Symons, became Hardie's secretary. A suffragette, she became the first woman to speak in the House of Commons after bursting into the chamber during a debate.

Williams stood unsuccessfully for a seat as county councillor for Woolwich in the 1898 London County Council election. He was successful in winning a seat at Lambeth North in the 1901 London County Council election, representing the Progressive Party. As a councillor Williams pressed for the LCC to adopt more stringent housing standards, including adopting the Fabian Society's "three rooms and a scullery" minimum. The LCC did not agree with all his proposals but did undertake to reject one-room tenements in favour of multi-roomed, self-contained flats. Williams was a member of the Independent Labour Party and sat on the executive committees of the Land Nationalisation Society and the London Reform Union.

Williams published a series of booklets on the living conditions of the poor and on building reform. He lamented the low quality of miners' housing, despite the fortunes made by the mine owners. Williams published a book, The Collier's House or Every Collier his own Architect, in 1893 (in English and Welsh) containing drawings showing improved housing for coal miners, particularly in the Welsh Valleys. He also wrote on conditions in London, publishing London Rookeries and Collier's Slums: a Plea for More Breathing Room in 1893 and More Light and Air for Londoners - the Effect of the New Streets and Buildings Bill on the Health of the People in 1894. Williams wrote The Face of the Poor or the Crowding of London's Labourers in 1897 and, with socialist politician Fred Knee, The Labourer and His Cottage in 1905. Williams' cottage designs were unusual for the time in showing internal toilets, at a time when outdoor privies were the norm. In 1906 he published Bond in Brickwork.

== Egypt ==
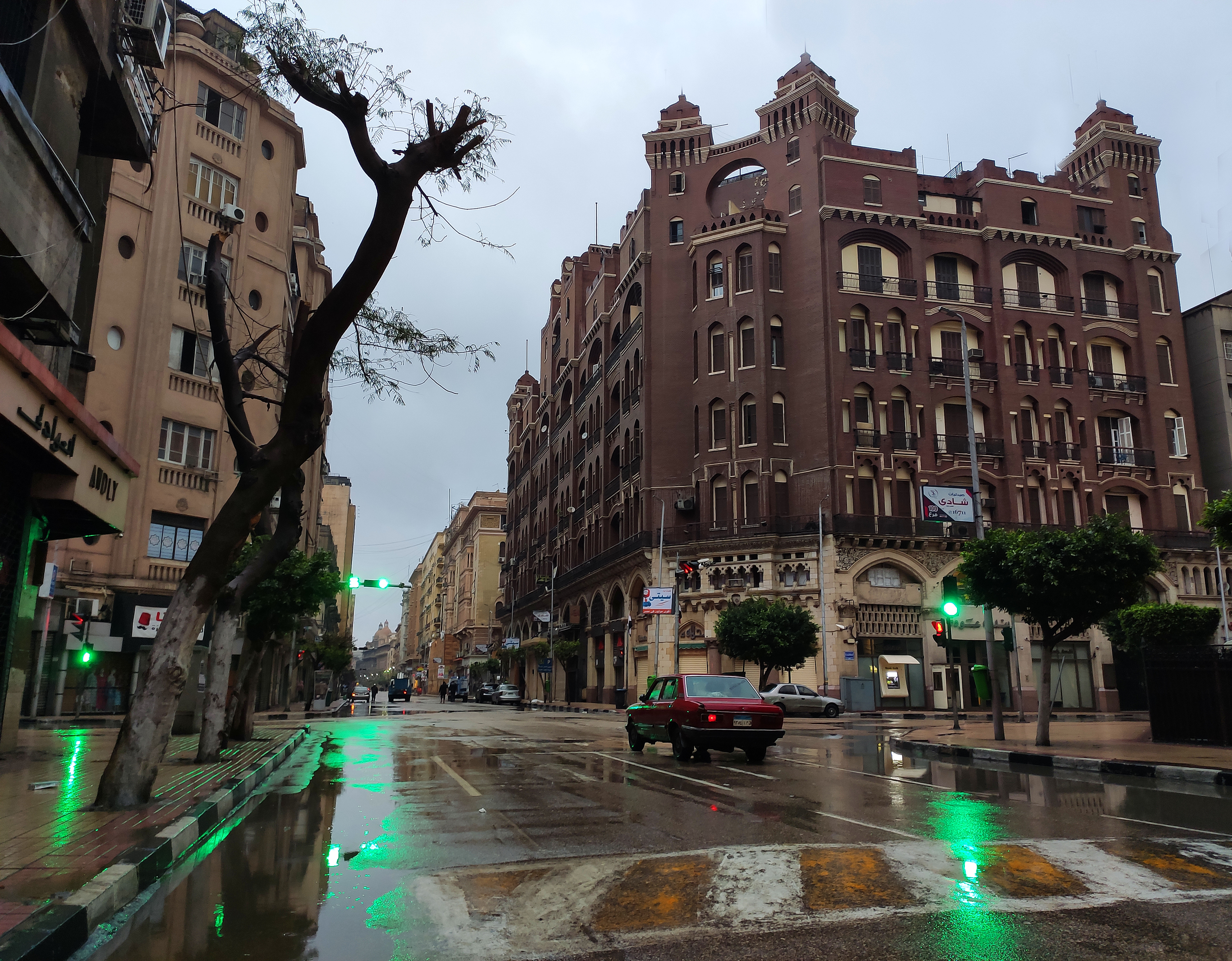
Davies Bryan Company shop building, Cairo

By the 1910s Williams was spending at least some of his time in Egypt. The Dictionary of Welsh Biography says he established an architecture practice there in 1914, having accepted a commission to design a shop in Cairo for the Welsh-owned Davies Bryan Company, however architectural historian Milva Giacomelli dates this construction to 1911 and 20th Century Architecture to 1912. (Note: Williams wrote to The Engineer in June 1913 to describe a visit he had made to the Aswan Low Dam the previous month. He noted he was at that time "engaged on collecting material for a work on modern building in Egypt" and gave his place of residence as Cairo.) The Cairo shop, also known as the St. David’s building, was built from red Aberdeen granite and Somerset Doulting freestone and was the largest shop in the city at that time of its completion. It had a strong Welsh influence, displaying the emblem and motto ("Y Gwir yn Erbyn y Byd" Welsh: "Truth against the world") of the Eisteddfod. Williams also refurbished one of the Davies Bryan Company's shops in Alexandria.

Williams designed several other prominent buildings in Egypt such as the Bible House in Port Said, the soldiers' home and Marconi Tower in Cairo and banks in Port Said and Tanta. He wrote Notes on the English Bond, intended as an educational book for local masons and published in English, French and Arabic. From Christmas 1916, he worked on an archaeological expedition to Upper Egypt, sponsored by Harvard and Yale universities, under the direction of American archaeologist George Andrew Reisner. Williams made architectural drawings of structures at Nuri (in modern-day Sudan), including the pyramid of Aramatle-qo and, from a raft moored in the Nile in March 1917, the entrance of the pyramid of Taharqa.

Williams died on 16 October 1918 in Cairo and is buried in the city's Protestant Cemetery. Williams was widely travelled in Europe, Asia and North Africa. His collection of rare books forms an important part of the architecture library at Cardiff University.
