= Chris Mottershead =

British travel industry entrepreneur

- Born: Christopher Alan Leigh Mottershead; 24 September 1958 (age 67); Cowbridge, Wales
- Education: University of Warwick
- Occupation: Businessman
- Title: Travel industry entrepreneur
- Spouse: Vivienne Piper
- Children: 4

Christopher Alan Leigh Mottershead (born 24 September 1958) is a British (Welsh) travel industry entrepreneur, and was the UK managing director of Thomas Cook.

== Early life ==
He attended Cowbridge Grammar School (Cowbridge Comprehensive School from 1974) in Cowbridge, Wales, then studied history at the University of Warwick.

== Career ==
He started as a graduate at Wales Gas.

=== TUI ===
From 2001 to 2004 he was the managing director of TUI UK, in Sussex. The group had over 900 retail shops, and 10,000 staff.

=== Thomas Cook ===
He joined Thomas Cook in April 2015. He became UK managing director of Thomas Cook Group on 1 October 2015.

=== Travel Leaders Group ===
In October 2019, Mottershead joined the Travel Leaders Group, parent company of Barrhead Travel. Mottershead was hired to coordinate the expansion efforts of the organisation to deliverer on growth and develop Barrhead branches across new locations.

== Personal life ==
Married to Vivienne Piper in July 1992 and together they have four children: Olivia, Lily, Holly and Joseph.

Media offices
Preceded by	Managing Director of Thomas Cook UK; October 2015 -	Succeeded by Incumbent
Preceded by	Managing Director of TUI UK; December 2001 - September 2004	Succeeded by Peter Rothwell
