= St Quintins Castle =

Castle in the Vale of Glamorgan, Wales

St Quintins Castle Llanblethian Castle
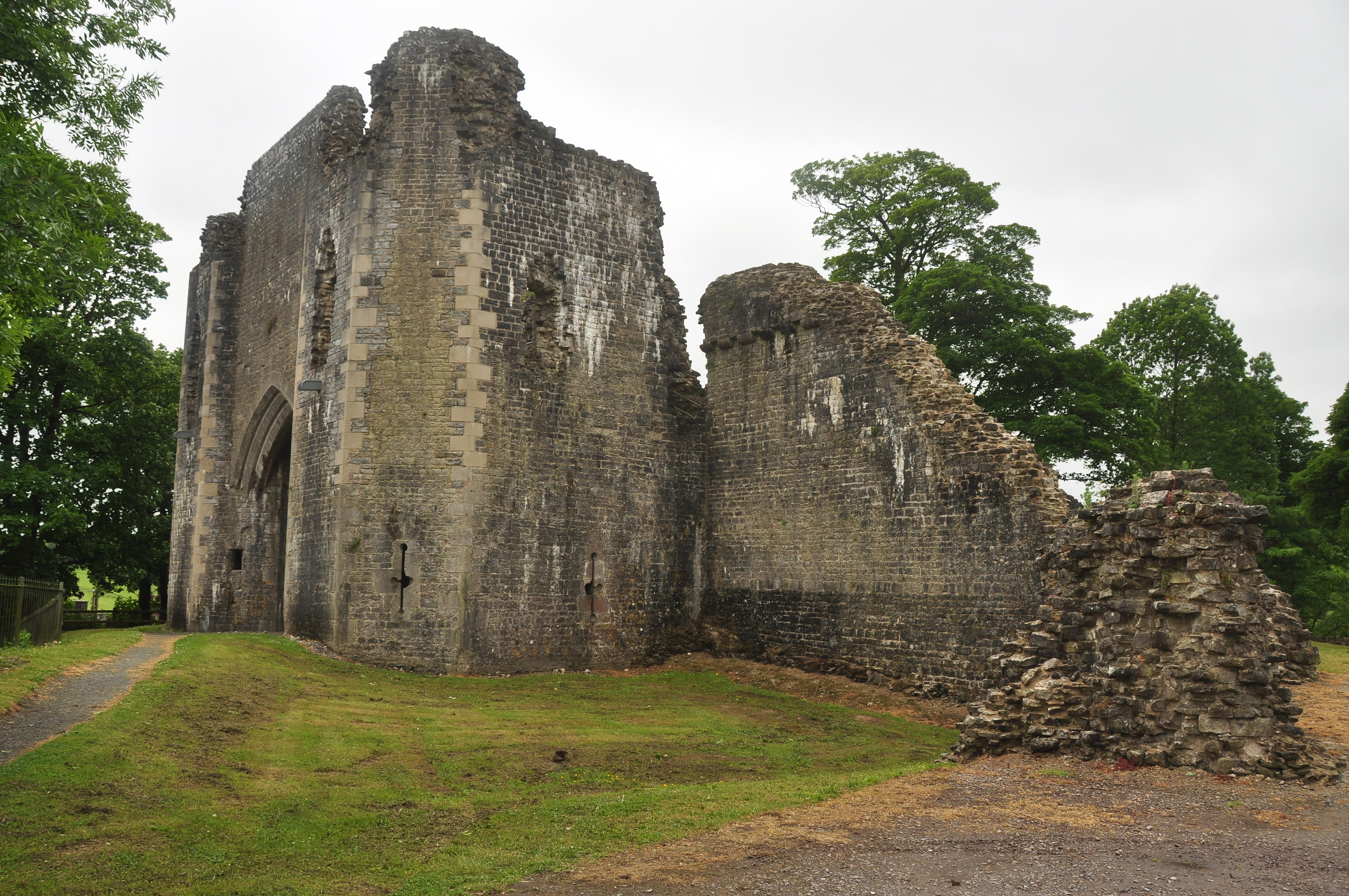
- The ruins of the gatehouse

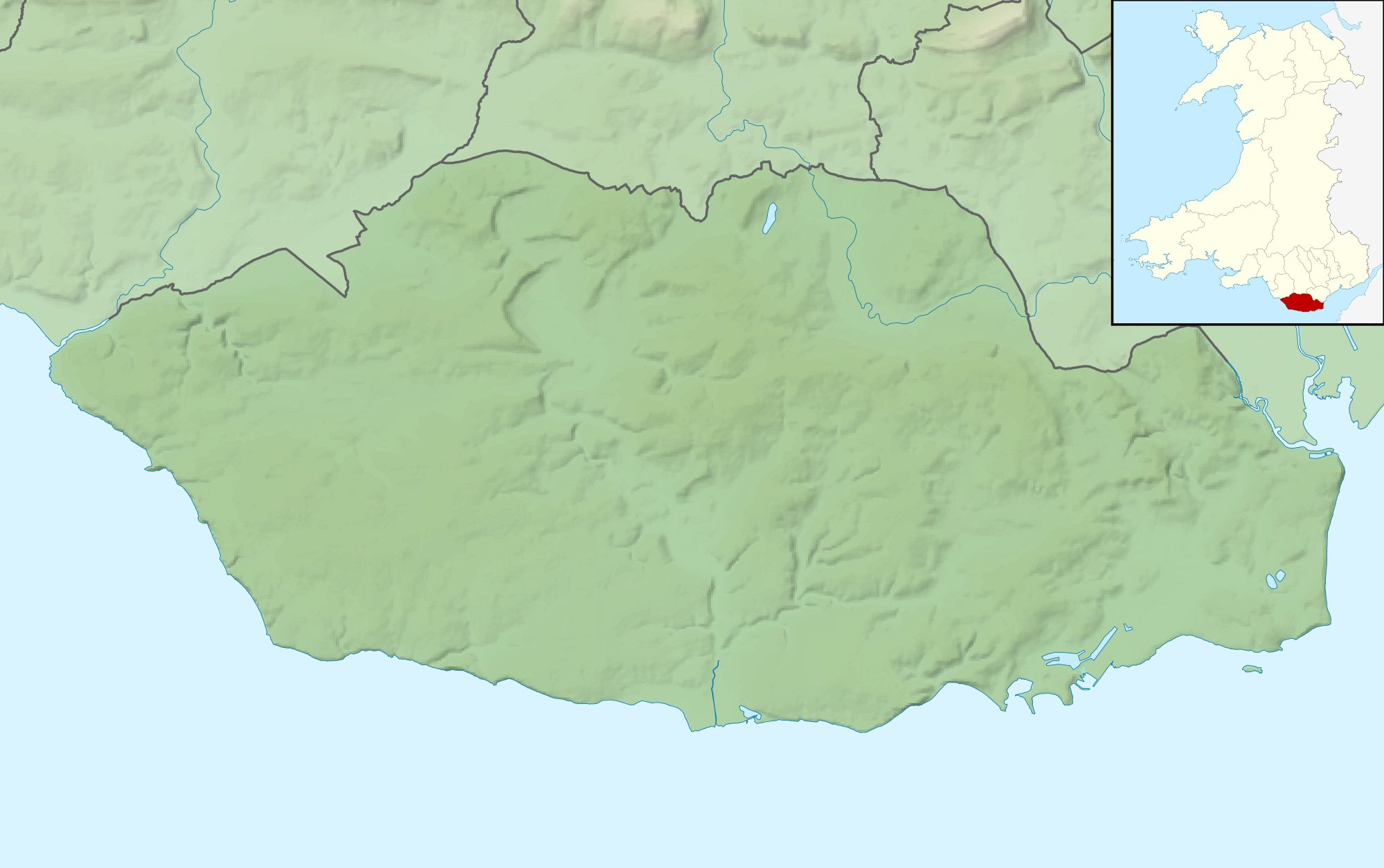
- Location in the Vale of Glamorgan
- 51.45745°N 3.45639°W
- Location: Cowbridge with Llanblethian, Vale of Glamorgan, Wales
- Nearest city: Cardiff

Scheduled monument
- Official name: St Quintin's Castle
- Reference no.: GM094

Listed Building – Grade II*
- Official name: St Quintin's Castle (Llanblethian Castle)
- Designated: 22 February 1963; 63 years ago
- Reference no.: 13146

St Quintins Castle (also known as St Quentins Castle and Llanblethian Castle, Welsh: Castell Llanfleiddan) is a castle located in the village of Llanblethian, Cowbridge, Wales. It is a scheduled monument and a Grade II* listed building and is under the care of Cadw. The site was first occupied with a defensive structure in about 1102 and the gatehouse and further building work took place around 1312. It was later used as a prison and was reported as being in a ruinous state by 1741.

== Initial fortifications ==
Around 1102 Robert Fitzhamon, the first Norman Lord of Glamorgan bequeathed the lands of Llanblethian as a lordship to Herbert de St Quentin who is thought to have built the first fortification at the site of the castle. This initial construct was believed to have been a simple ringwork defence with timber walls, a bank and ditch. A rectangular stone keep was built in the late 12th century, whose remains can now be found within the later gatehouse. This keep may have replaced a similar wooden structure.

== 14th-century reinforcements ==
The lordship remained with the St Quentin family until 1233 when the land was seized by Richard Siward, but he then lost it to Earl Richard de Clare in 1245. Richard de Clare seized large areas of this part of Glamorganshire, from Cowbridge to Llantrisant, but it was his grandson, Earl Gilbert de Clare, who began to build the stone structure of St Quintins Castle which stands today. This was thought to have been roughly after 1307, but Gilbert de Clare was killed in the Battle of Bannockburn in 1314 before the castle was completed. Modern historians believe that the lack of inner courtyard buildings and the weakness of the curtain wall points to the hypothesis that the castle was never fully completed.

== Defensive layout ==
The castle itself is a rectangular stone walled enclosure, roughly 64 metres East to West. The walls are roughly 120 centimetres in thickness. It is set on a spur above steep slopes on all sides apart from the East side. The weak East side of the fortification is protected by a twin-tower gatehouse and a further two towers East entrance facade. The best defensive side is the southern side which falls away sharply to the River Thaw. It was reported as being ruinous by 1741.

== The castle today ==
The base of a semi-octagonal tower can be seen at the southeast corner of the castle and parts of a tower at the southwest corner. The ivy-clad gatehouse is between these and is a substantial structure where you can see the slits for the two portcullises and the fittings for the sets of strong doors. The remains of the keep are largely rubble and little remains of the bailey walls on the east, north and south sides. It is a scheduled monument and a Grade II* listed building.

== See also ==
- List of castles in Wales
