= Aberthin =

Coordinates: 51.46704°N 3.42948°W

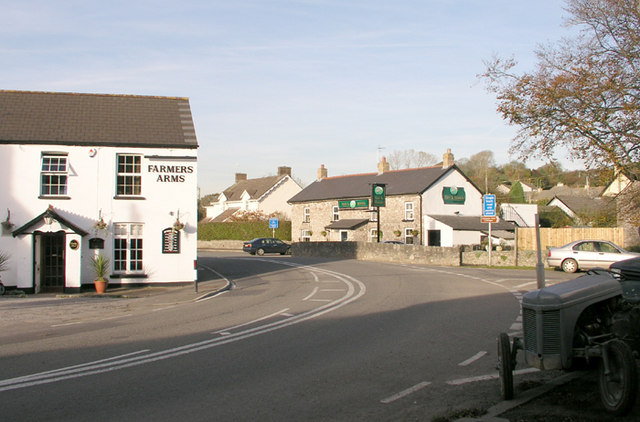
- Aberthin

- Location within the Vale of Glamorgan
- OS grid reference: ST008752
- Community: Cowbridge with Llanblethian
- Principal area: Vale of Glamorgan
- Preserved county: South Glamorgan
- Country: Wales
- Sovereign state: United Kingdom
- Post town: Cowbridge
- Postcode district: CF71
- Police: South Wales
- Fire: South Wales
- Ambulance: Welsh
- UK Parliament: Vale of Glamorgan
- Senedd Cymru – Welsh Parliament: Vale of Glamorgan

Aberthin is a small village, just outside Cowbridge in the Vale of Glamorgan, South Wales, on the north side of a shallow valley, less than a mile northeast of Cowbridge across the A48 road. Cowbridge Comprehensive School lies just to the southwest of the village. About 250 metres to the south is an old quarry, with a "faulted strip of grey oolite". Aberthin is also the name of a brook, the River Aberthin. The village was served by the Aberthin Platform railway station between 1905 and 1920, now a field to the west of Aberthin.

== Etymology ==
Thomas Morgan recorded an early belief that the village had been a place of druidic sacrifices, and that the name derived from the word Abertha (sacrifice). However, this derivation is now considered a folk etymology. As the Nant y Berthyn's confluence (or "Aber" in Welsh) with the River Thaw located just to the west of the village's centre, the name is most likely a contraction of "Aber-Nant-y-Berthyn".

== Notable landmarks ==
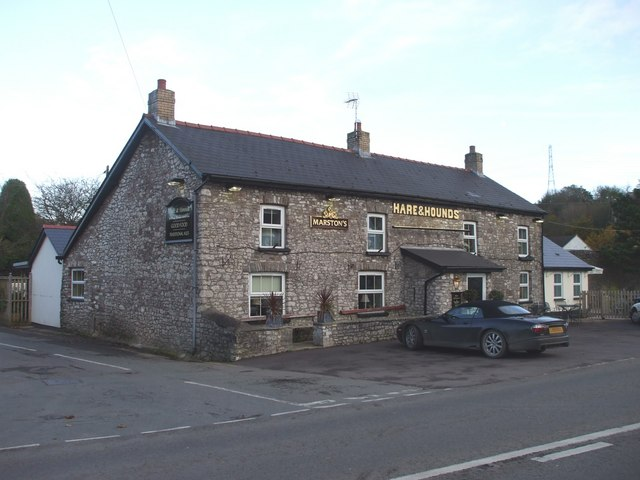

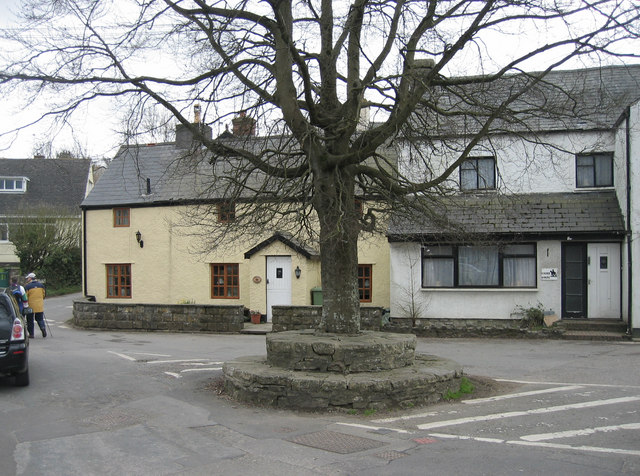

It has no shops, but does have two pubs, a village hall which when built in 1749 was created as Wales's second purpose-built Calvinistic Methodist meeting house, and a notable tree in the middle of the roundabout. The Methodist church and village was visited in 1746 by Howell Harries and it was at the church where Peter Williams gave a speech in which he was disowned by the Methodists. Houses in the area include Llansannor Court and Great House, Aberthin.

== Culture ==
The village hall committee organises many events throughout the year, such as a duck race (where plastic yellow ducks are raced down the stream), a free bonfire and fireworks display (held on the Downs overlooking the village), quiz nights, amateur dramatics, barn dances, and an annual Village Day, which has a barbecue, live music and a dog show.
