= Llanblethian =

Coordinates: 51.456°N 3.460°W

Llanblethian: Welsh: Llanfleiddan
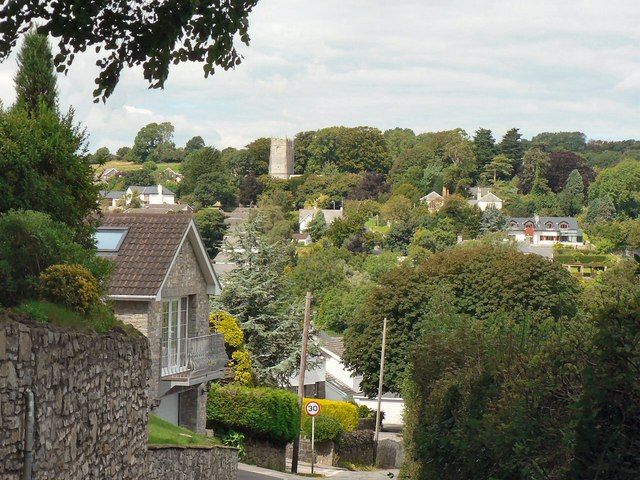
- View of Llanblethian looking north towards St John the Baptist Church

- Location within the Vale of Glamorgan
- OS grid reference: SS986741
- Community: Cowbridge with Llanblethian
- Principal area: Vale of Glamorgan
- Preserved county: South Glamorgan
- Country: Wales
- Sovereign state: United Kingdom
- Post town: COWBRIDGE
- Postcode district: CF71
- Dialling code: 01446
- Police: South Wales
- Fire: South Wales
- Ambulance: Welsh
- UK Parliament: Vale of Glamorgan
- Senedd Cymru – Welsh Parliament: Vale of Glamorgan

Llanblethian (Welsh: Llanfleiddan) is a village in the Vale of Glamorgan in Wales which sits upon the River Thaw. It makes up part of the community of Cowbridge with Llanblethian, which consists of the village itself, the larger market town of Cowbridge and Aberthin.

Llanblethian first came to prominence as one of the manor lordships created by the Norman lords following the Norman invasion of Wales. It was first ruled by the St. Quentins before being taken over by the Siwards. Under the Norman lordship power in the region shifted from the village to nearby Cowbridge, where manorial affairs were conducted. Llanblethian has several fine large buildings including an early 18th century great house, a 12th-century church dedicated to St John the Baptist and its own castle, a largely ruinous structure but with a fine gatehouse known locally as St Quintins Castle.

== Etymology ==
Llanblethian takes its name from Saint Bleiddian, a contemporary of Germanus of Auxerre (Welsh: Garmon Sant). Llan is Welsh for a clearing, so the village is the 'clearing (around the church of) St Bleddian'. The root of blaidd is a translation of lupus, the wolf. )

== History ==
Evidence of early settlements in the area now known as Llanblethian have been discovered in various locations around the village. To the west of Llanblethian, between Breach and Marlborough farms, tumuli - ancient burial mounds - dating from the Bronze Age have been found. On Llanblethian Hill is the site of Caer Dynnaf, a large Iron Age fort, whose walls and ditches can still be seen.

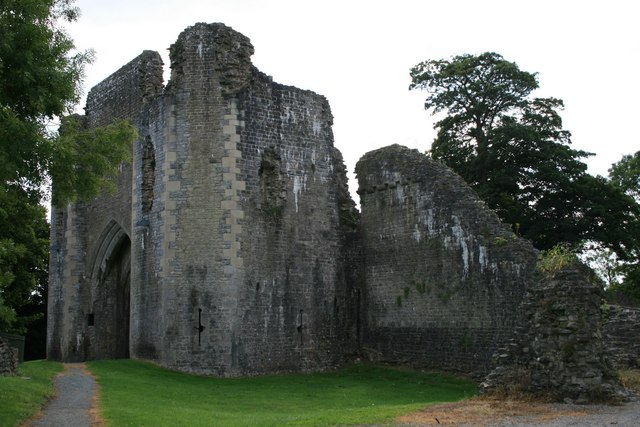
The Gatehouse of St Quentin's Castle

Although no reliable accounts exist of life in Glamorgan in the first 150 years of Norman rule it is known the manor of Llanblethian existed as one of the twelve "member lordships", large areas of land that Glamorgan was divided up into by the Norman Lord Robert Fitzhamon. Most of these manors, specifically the hilly valley regions were held by subservient local Welsh rulers, but Llanblethian and its neighbor Talyfan were held by Norman feudatories, including Robert de Wintona, who built the Llanquian Castle. The first lord of Llanblethian manor was Robert St. Quentin, a powerful Norman knight who held lands in Wiltshire, Dorset, Essex and Yorkshire. The St. Quentin family established a fortification within the village. but in 1233 the family was disposed by Richard Siward the lord of Talyfan. With the lordship passing to the de Clare family, an early keep built by the St Quentin family was fortified further with the addition of a gatehouse and curtain wall.

During the medieval period it is recorded that a fulling mill existed in the area, as well as wind or water powered grain mills. An extensive manor stretching far beyond the village boundaries, the local economy was based heavily on agriculture. It was during this period that administrative affairs of the manor began moving towards the nearby settlement of Cowbridge.

By the 18th century, Llanblethian contained a few large houses, but was essentially a collection of farms with the economy supported by craftsmen with some emphasis on the weaving trade. A hundred years later the village had begun attracting wealthy residents, including retired military and naval officers. This still left the majority of the population made up of poorly paid labourers, servants and farm-workers.

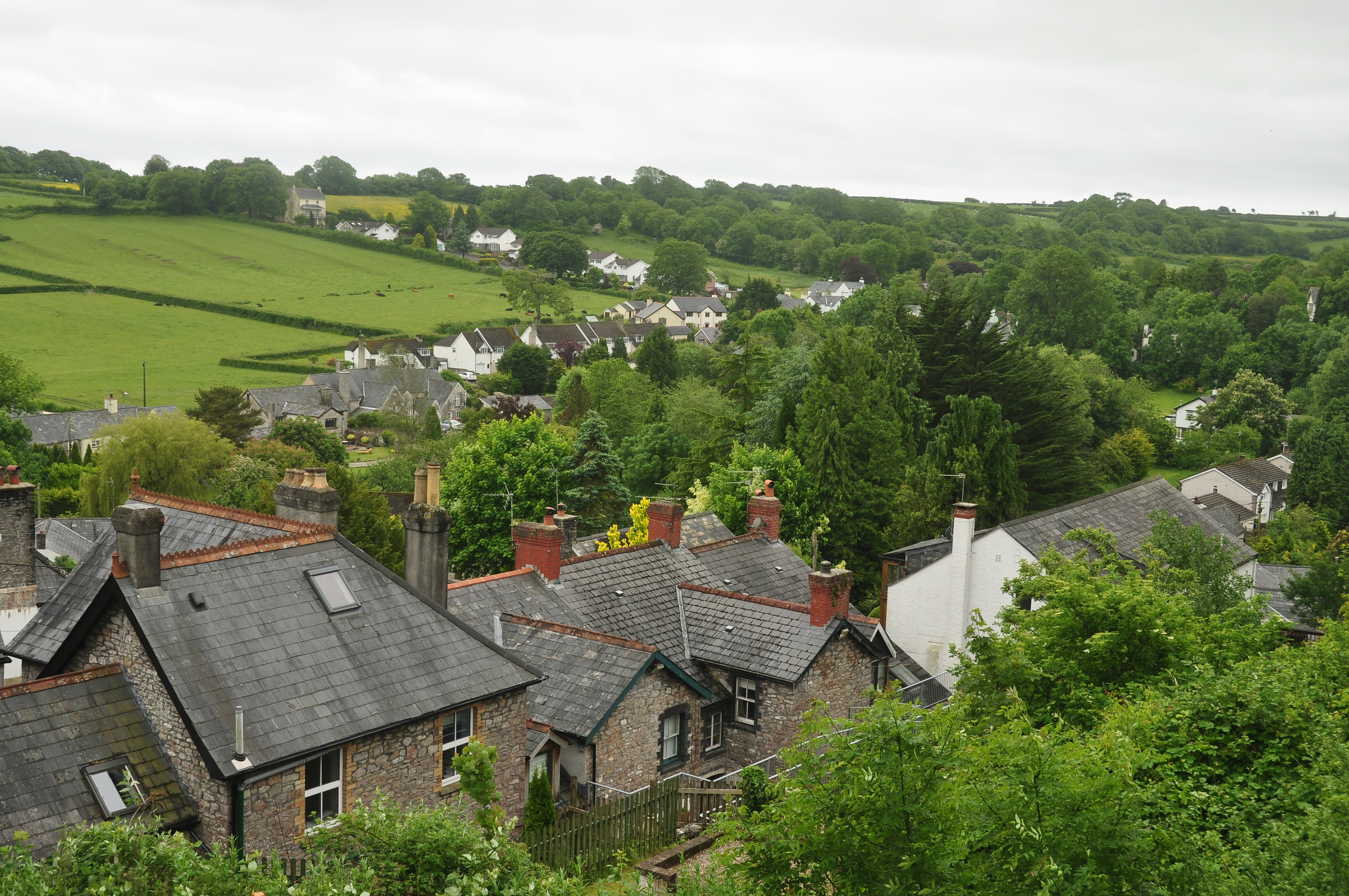
View of Llanblethian looking south from St Quintin's Castle

Up until the mid 20th century the majority of employment was local, though with changes in employment patterns in Britain the majority of residents now commute to work outside the village.

== Buildings of note ==
- The Church of St John the Baptist is a Grade I listed building. Its earliest evidence is in the chancel which is established as 12th century, though much of the church is of a later date. The west tower is in the Somerset style and is reputedly gifted by Anne Neville, the wife of King Richard III. Whether or not this is true, the tower still stands as an exotic with its features similar to those found in Cornwall and Devon, but rarely in Glamorgan. The tower contains a ring of six bells which were restored and rehung in 1994. The interiors are heavily restored by C. B. Fowler of Cardiff in 1896–97. Of note within the church is a stone effigy of a man with a greyhound at his feet and a simple but handsome tablet dedicated to the parents of local benefactor Sir Leoline Jenkins, dated 1763.

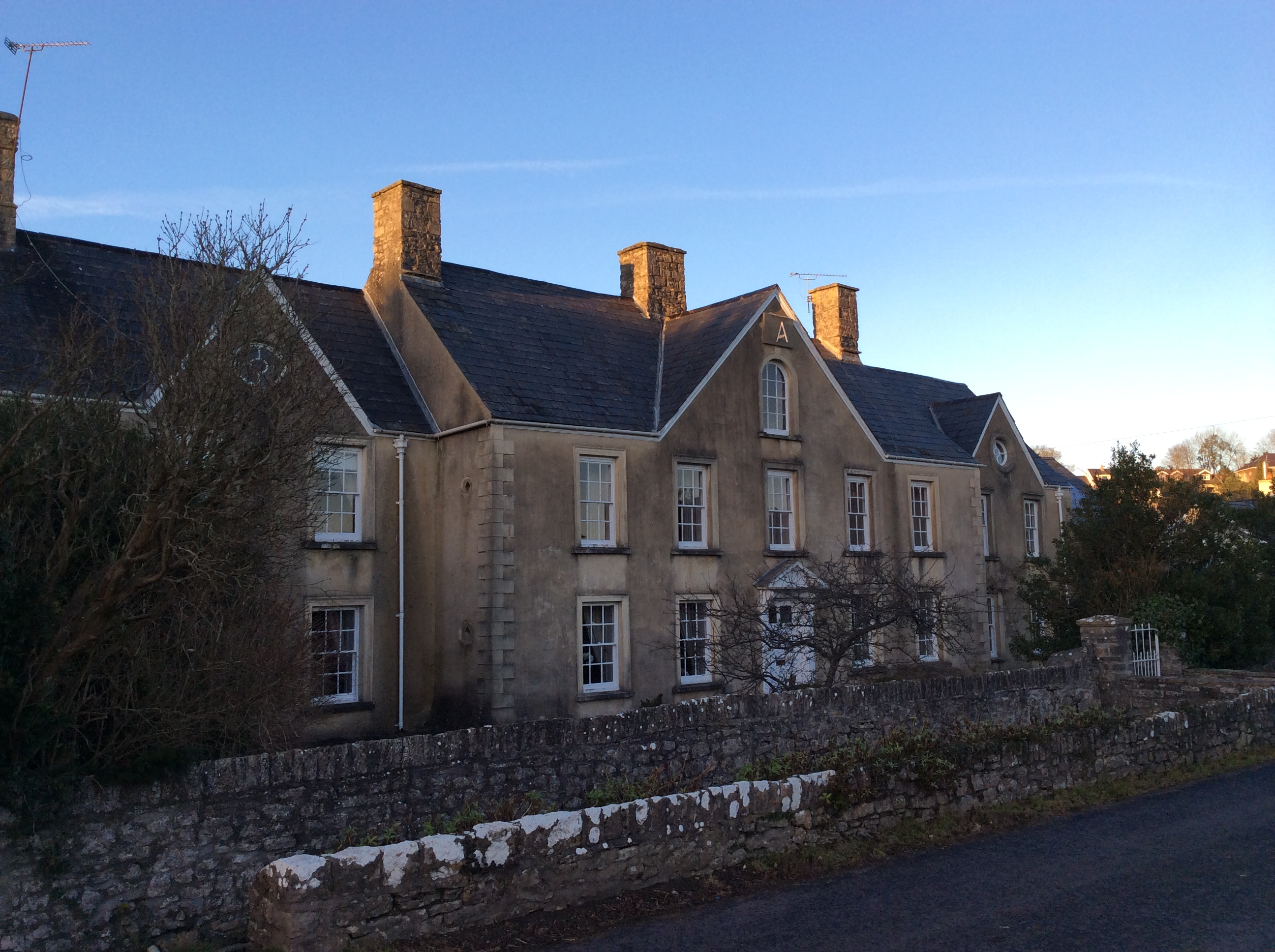
The Great House on Bridge Road.

- St Quintins Castle is a ruined fortification located on a spur across the valley from St John the Baptist Church. Although known locally as St Quintin's Castle the only part of it which can be attributed to the St Quentin family is a mound of stones on a raised mound which has been identified as the remains of a 12th-century keep. The castle begun by the St Quentins fell into the hands of Richard de Clare in 1245 after the outlawry of Richard Siward. It was de Clare's grandson Gilbert de Clare, 8th Earl of Gloucester who commenced building of the outer walls and gatehouse in 1312, but remained unfinished after his untimely death at the Battle of Bannockburn two years later. The gatehouse, which still stands, is integrally built into the curtain wall. The curtain wall is an irregular quadrilateral roughly 50 metres by 52 metres at its widest parts, though little remains above the foundations.
- On the main road through the village lies the Great House, a Grade II* listed building. A two-storey building with five bays with two-bayed recessed ends, the 18th century front is rendered and colour washed. In the central gable is located a sundial bearing the initials T.W. (Thomas Wilkins) dated 1703. Although this date is too early for the façade, the hall fireplace is also initialed T.W. and dated 1710. There are handsome early 18th century paneling in one of the lower rooms.

== Footnotes ==
Notes

Primary sources

- Cowbridge Record Society (2001). Llanblethian Buildings & People. Cowbridge: Cowbridge Record Society. ISBN 0953702928.
- Davies, John; Jenkins, Nigel; Menna, Baines; Lynch, Peredur I., eds. (2008). The Welsh Academy Encyclopaedia of Wales. Cardiff: University of Wales Press. ISBN 978-0-7083-1953-6.
- Newman, John (1995). Glamorgan. London: Penguin Group. ISBN 0140710566.
- Gunter, Maud (1961). "The Manor of Llanblethian". In Williams, Stewart (ed.). The Garden of Wales. Barry: Stewart Williams Publishers.
