= Cowbridge Town Hall =

Municipal building in Cowbridge, Wales

- Neuadd y Dref Y Bont-faen (Welsh)
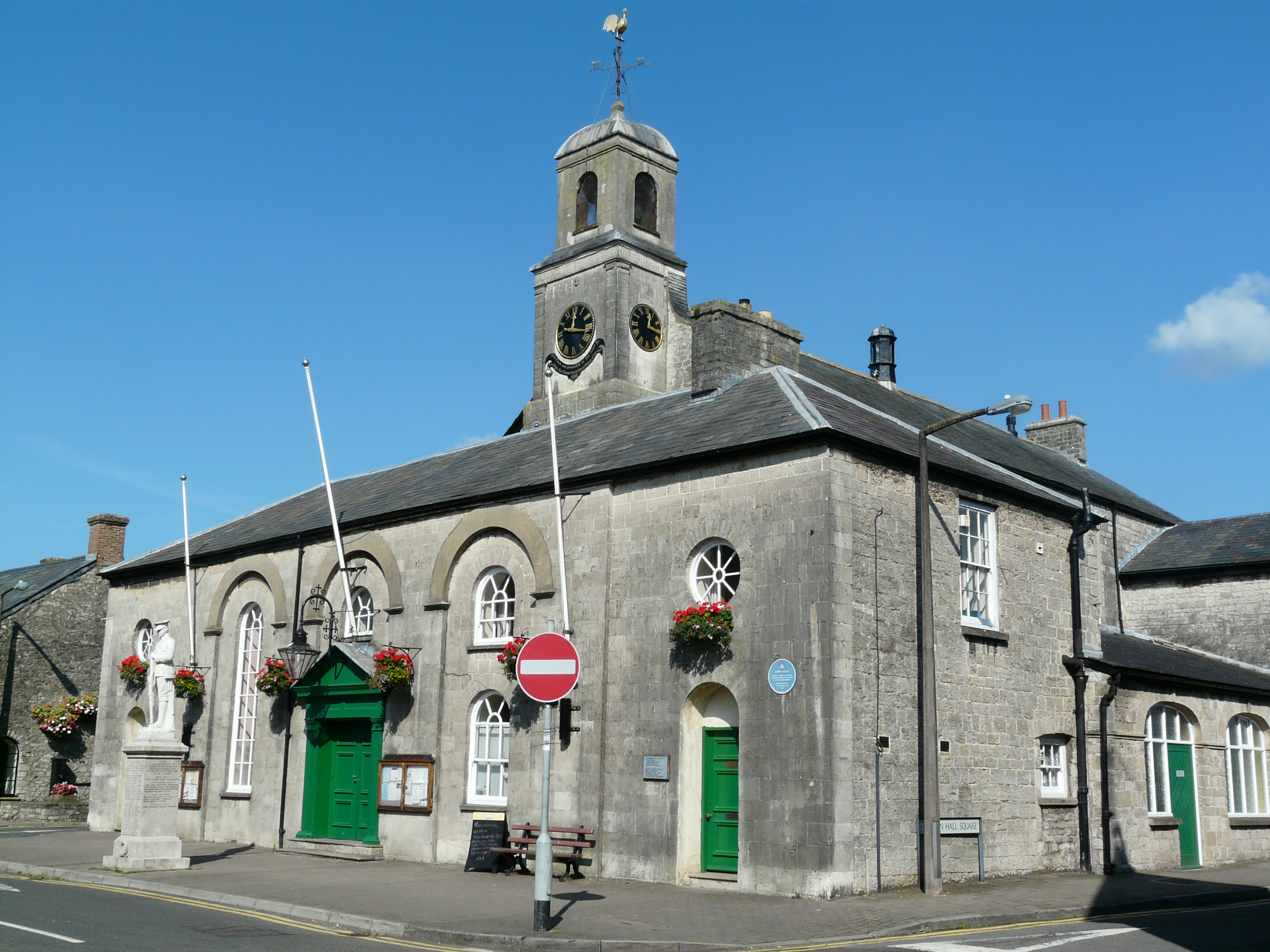
- Cowbridge Town Hall

- Shown in Vale of Glamorgan
- 51.4618°N 3.4471°W
- Location: Cowbridge

History
- Built: 1806

Listed Building – Grade II*
- Designated: 5 December 1963
- Reference no.: 13200

Cowbridge Town Hall (Welsh: Neuadd y Dref Y Bont-faen) is a public building in the High Street of Cowbridge in South Wales. The town hall, which is the meeting place for Cowbridge with Llanblethian Town Council, and also houses the town clerk's office, the committee rooms and the Cowbridge Museum, is a Grade II* listed building.

== History ==
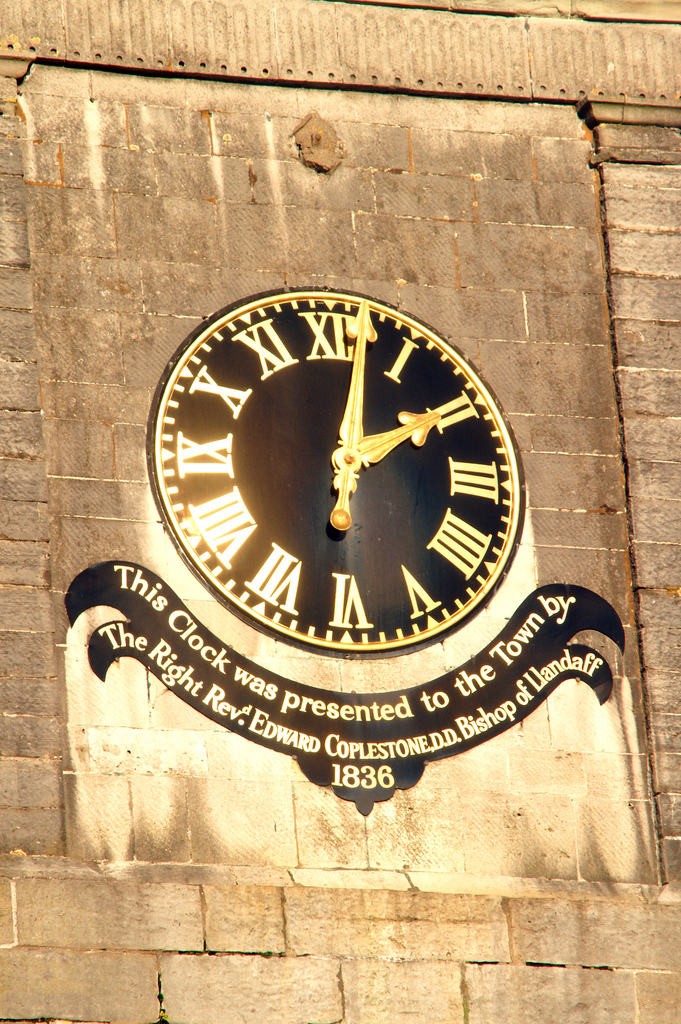
The clock tower

The town hall was commissioned to replace an aging guildhall, located in the middle of the High Street, which had previously been the civic meeting place as well as the venue for the Quarter Sessions which travelled around South Wales. Civic leaders found that the guildhall was restricting the movement of traffic in the High Street and decided to find an alternative venue: the site they selected was a building dating back to 1806 which had served as a prison or "House of Correction" but had fallen vacant when correctional activities were consolidated in Swansea. Plans of the House of Correction dating from 1823 show the two-storeyed building flanked by the walls of prisoners' exercise yards, which were incorporated into the new Town Hall to provide additional rooms.

In 1824 it was reported that the "Plans and estimate of the expense attending the erection of a new Town Hall ... have been procured by the Revd. John Montgomery Traherne at his own expense". On 15 October 1829 and 22 July 1830 The Court of Common Council for Cowbridge ordered that thanks be given to Isaiah Verity Esq of Ash Hall (son of John Verity of Rooley Hall, Bowling) for "offering ground for the erection of the Town Hall". Verity, in gratitude for planning and directing the new town hall, was awarded the freedom of the borough, after the conversion of the building from a House of Correction to a town hall was completed in 1830. (Note: There is documentary evidence of a previous House of Correction on the same site dating back to 1576.)

The borough council, which had met in the town hall, was abolished under the Municipal Corporations Act 1883. The building was restored and enlarged in 1895. Internally, there were two main committee rooms inside the building and a mayor's parlour. In the floor of the parlour, the remains of one of the wells which were located in the exercise yards to provide water for prisoners can still be seen.

The design involved a broadly symmetrical frontage with five bays facing the High Street; the central bay featured a gabled doorway on the ground floor flanked by pilasters with a small rounded headed window on the first floor; the bay to the left had a tall round-headed window while the bay to the right had two smaller round-headed windows one above the other; the end bays featured smaller doorways with oculi above; a two-stage clock tower with a cupola was erected at roof level. The clock in the clock tower was donated by Edward Copleston, the Bishop of Llandaff.

A war memorial commemorating local people who had died in the First World War was unveiled in front of the town hall in 1921. The building was renovated in 1974.

The Cowbridge Museum, which was established in the 1980s, took over six of the eight intact prison cells, to accommodate and display its collection.
