= John Davies Bryan =

Welsh businessman (1857 – 1888)

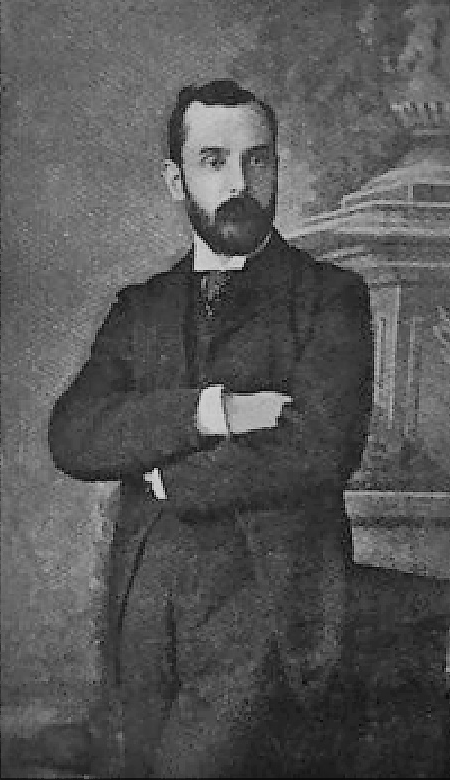
Bryan, as portrayed in O'r Aifft

John Davies Bryan (1857 – 13 November 1888) was a Welsh businessman. A draper in Caernarfon, he travelled in Egypt in late 1886 for health reasons. The following year he emigrated to the country and established a haberdashery shop within the Continental Hotel in Cairo. Joined in the business by his brother Joseph he established a second shop in Alexandria in 1888. Following his death his brothers expanded the business with new branches and built the largest store in Cairo in 1910. In 1908 a collection of letters written by Bryan from his travels in Egypt was published as the Welsh-language book O'r Aifft (Welsh: "From Egypt").

== Early life ==
John Davies Bryan was born in 1857 in Llanarmon-yn-Iâl, Denbighshire, in North Wales. His father was lead miner Edward Bryan and his mother was Elinor Bryan. Bryan had three younger brothers: Robert, Edward and Joseph. They moved to Wrexham when Bryan was three years old and the brothers grew up there, tutored by their mother and speaking Welsh. Bryan was apprenticed to shopkeeper Enoch Lewis in Mostyn, Flintshire. Lewis, and his son John Herbert Lewis, instilled in Bryan an appreciation for the Welsh language and culture. Bryan afterwards worked in a shop in Bold Street, Liverpool. When his health became poor he returned to Wales, settling at Caernarfon, Gwynedd, where he was apprenticed to the drapers Pierce & Williams. Bryan accumulated enough capital to open his own shop, Bryan Brother's Drapers in Bridge Street, Caernarfon, which he ran with Edward.

== Egypt ==
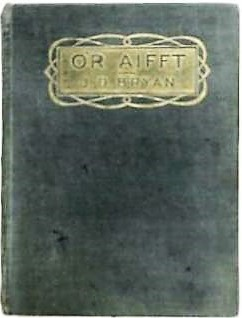
Cover of O'r Aifft (From Egypt) by J. D. Bryan, 1908

With his health failing again Bryan accepted an offer from his cousin Samuel Evans to take a trip to Egypt in October 1886. Bryan's health confined him to the north of the country where, instead of becoming interested in discovering the ancient culture of Egypt as many foreign travellers did, he developed an interest in contemporary Egyptian society. Bryan wrote numerous letters to friends and family in Wales, recounting his travels and observations. Some of these were published in the Welsh newspaper Y Genedl Gymreig and, in 1908, as the book O'r Aifft (Welsh: "From Egypt").

Bryan returned to Wales but travelled again to Egypt in 1887, intending to remain there longer-term. He established a haberdashery shop within the Continental Hotel in Cairo selling hats, drapery, hosiery and shoes. Bryan was soon joined in Cairo by his brother Joseph. Bryan opened a branch in Alexandria's Sherif Pasha Street in 1888, which he named Dewi Sant (Welsh: Saint David). A second brother Edward joined the company in 1888. Bryan died of typhoid fever on 13 November 1888 and was buried in the British Cemetery in Cairo.

== Davies Bryan Company ==
The company continued under Bryan's brothers following his death. The fourth brother, Robert, joined the company from 1903, spending winters in Egypt and the summers in Wales. The brothers sold the Caernarfon store in 1889 but opened new branches at Port Said, Egypt, and Khartoum, Anglo-Egyptian Sudan. A larger branch in Cairo was thought desirable and the company asked Welsh architect Robert Williams to design a 1,900 square metres (20,000 sq ft) store in the popular Sharia Emad Al Din district. The store, fronting al-Maghrabi, Mohammed Farid and al-Manakh streets, three of the busiest in the district, opened in 1910. It was a landmark building of red Aberdeen granite and Somerset Doulting freestone. The building featured many Welsh cultural symbols such as those of the Eisteddfod, including its motto "Y Gwir yn Erbyn y Byd" (Welsh: "Truth against the world"). The frontage also bore the D and B family initials. The store, the largest in Cairo, became a "pilgrimage for all Welsh travellers" to Egypt. The company was well respected and Arab Egyptians entrusted it with large gold deposits, over the banks.

Davies Bryan's brothers continued the business until the last surviving, Edward, died in 1929. The company's chief accountant Fred Purslow then bought a share in the company and continued to run the Cairo store under its original name well into the 1950s. The store was sold around 1957 to the Syrian Chourbaguis brothers, whose name was painted over the Davies Bryan original signage. In 1961 it was acquired by a state-owned insurance company and returned to the Chourbaguis family in the early 21st century. In 2008 the building was purchased by the Al-Ismailia real estate investment firm. It is now divided into smaller shops including Stephenson's Pharmacy which has preserved some of the original architectural features as a monument to the Welsh presence in Egypt.
