= Wheatsheaf Hall =

Mission hall in Lambeth, London, England

Coordinates: 51.4809°N 0.1253°W

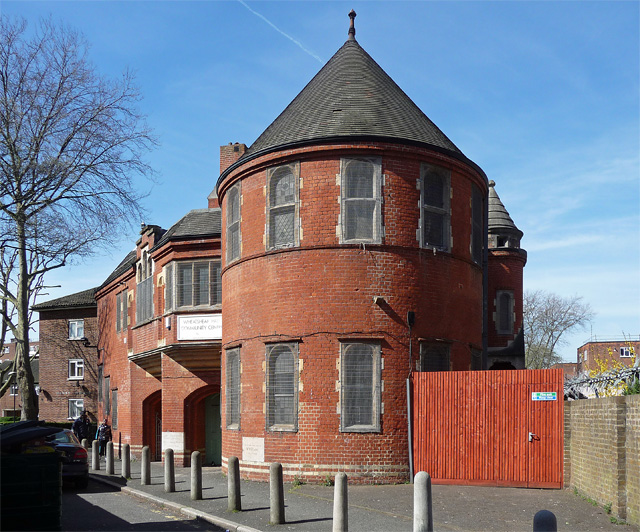
Wheatsheaf Hall

The Wheatsheaf Hall is a former Congregational Church mission hall in Vauxhall, south London. It is a grade II listed building.

The earliest reference of the building was a small villa in 1880, which was brought by Mr. William Sproston Caine. As social/religious meetings and societies flourished, a new building was designed by Robert Williams and later built by the Higgs and Hill Construction Company.

It opened in 1896 as the Wheatsheaf Congregational Church Mission and was used as a mission hall and public library until 1939. In 1980 Lambeth Council started the process to turn it into a tenants' hall and community centre. It opened in 1988 as Wheatsheaf Hall Community Centre. In 2020 it was used as a COVID-19 testing centre as part of NHS Test and Trace.

It is also used a venue for music charity "In Harmony" and is often rented out for private use.
