= River Thaw =

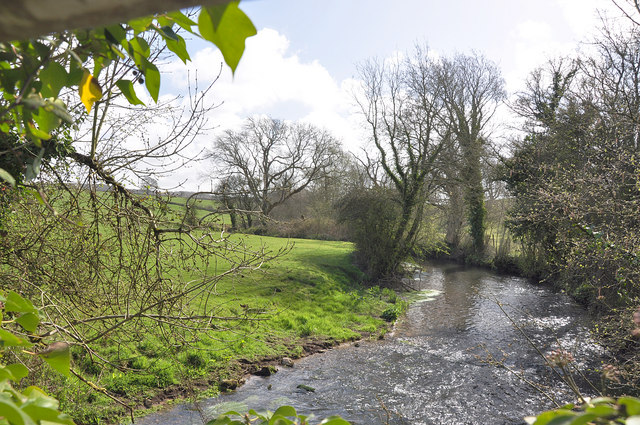
- The River Thaw south of Cowbridge
- Native name: Afon Ddawan (Welsh)

Location
- Country: United Kingdom, Wales
- Region: South Wales
- County: Vale of Glamorgan
- Cities: Cowbridge, Llanblethian, Aberthaw

Physical characteristics
- Source
  - location: Southwest of Llanharry, Vale of Glamorgan, Vale of Glamorgan, Wales
  - coordinates: 51.5082°N 3.4509°W
- Mouth
  - location: Bristol Channel
  - coordinates: 51.3828°N 3.3961°W
- Length: 20.0 km (12.4 mi)
- Discharge
  - location: Breaksea Point, Vale of Glamorgan

Basin features
- Tributaries
  - left: Kenson River, Nant Tre-gof, Nant Aberthin
  - right: Nant y Stepsau, Factory Brook

The River Thaw (Welsh: Afon Ddawan) (also Ddaw) is a river in the Vale of Glamorgan, south Wales. At 20 kilometres/12.4 miles, it is the longest river entirely in the Vale of Glamorgan.

== Course ==
Its source is in the hills just south of the M4 Motorway near Llanharry. It flows in a generally south-eastern direction through the town of Cowbridge, then turns southward and reaches the Bristol Channel at Breaksea Point, south of Aberthaw.

== Environment ==
The river supports healthy populations of a variety of fish. However, several stretches of the river no longer support a European water vole population, despite having a once sizeable population. Unlike many rivers in south Wales, the Thaw was never subject to much pollution, except at its mouth which was diverted to feed the Aberthaw Power Station. In the last century, there has been a slight decline in the river's biodiversity. Its major tributary, the Kenson River, is polluted in its lower reaches due to agricultural run-off and effluents leaking from nearby quarries. The river is also a popular site for various kinds of recreation, accessible for much of its course, much of which is used for agriculture. There are many archaeological sites along the river. The river was once large enough for the villages and settlements along its banks to have access to shipping and thus the sea. Its estuary was once wider, but silting and impoundments have reduced its size considerably.

== Tributaries ==
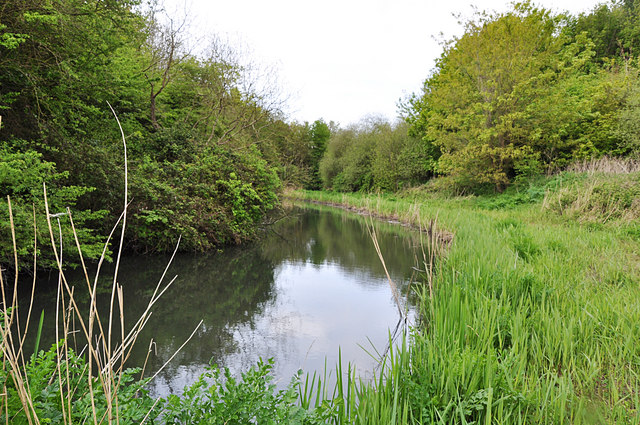
The Kenson River is the Thaw's largest tributary

The river picks up many tributaries along its course, making its watershed the largest in the Vale of Glamorgan.

The Kenson River is by far the largest tributary of the river. It has a total length of 2 miles and is formed at the confluence of two other rivers, the Waycock and the Nant Llancarfan. It runs southwest through the village of Penmark and near Rhoose and Cardiff International Airport. The Kenson is also known for its good angling, and had many tributaries of its own. These include the River Waycock which is itself 9 kilometres long, and flows through Dyffryn and Penmark. It has many sources between Wenvoe and St Lythans, and meets the Nant Llancarfan at Penmark. The Nant Llancarfan rises at Bonvilston, flowing southward for 5 miles.

A stream known as the Factory Brook is a mile and a half long. It flows east, to meet the Thaw at Cowbridge.

The Nant y Stepsau is 2 miles long. Rising between the villages of Llanmaes and Eglwys Brewis, it flows northeast.

The Nant Tre-gof is a minor tributary of the river. It starts near the small village of Llantrithyd near the A48 and flows southwest for nearly 3 miles, through the hamlet of Treguff (this name is a corruption of Tre-gof). Its confluence with the Thaw is nearly opposite that of the Nant y Stepsau.

The Nant y Berthyn is the smallest named tributary. It flows through the small village of Aberthin, and is under a mile long. It is sometimes named as Nant Aberthin, a back-formation from the name of the village.

An unnamed brook flows through St Athan. Its length is approximately 1.5 miles, and it joins the Thaw near its mouth.

The Nant Llanmihangel is over a mile long. It comes from Llanmihangel, and flows into the river at Llandough, south of Llanblethian.

There are many insignificant, and thus unnamed, tributaries of the Thaw. One flows in the same direction of the Thaw for a mile or so, and flows amongst a dismantled railway and power cables. The stream in question meets the Thaw near the village of Flemingston and is very near the Nant Tre-gof.

== Flooding ==
On 31 October 1998, water levels in the river reached its highest recorded level and the river flooded, causing significant damage to 4 properties in Cowbridge, 4 in Aberthin, and 17 in Llanblethian. The flooding was caused by flood water over-topping the banks of main rivers and ordinary watercourses, and restrictions to flow in channels and surcharging of drains.

== Estuary ==
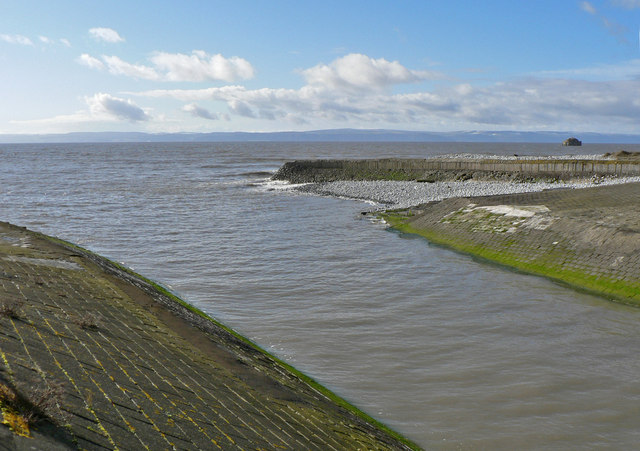
The artificial mouth of the river at Aberthaw

The river meets the Bristol Channel at a shingle beach called Leys Beach, at Breaksea Point, one of the southernmost points of Wales. It flows through the village of Aberthaw. At its mouth is the Aberthaw Power Station, which is split into two complexes, Aberthaw A and Aberthaw B, on the opposite sides of the river. When Aberthaw A first opened in February 1966, it was the most advanced power station in the world. Aberthaw B opened in the 1970s. The power station (now closed) burned coal with a generating capacity of 1455 megawatts. Proposals for a nuclear power station on the site were rejected due to close proximity to Cardiff. Aberthaw A was subsequently demolished in 1995. For centuries, an active, albeit small, port stood at the river's mouth, and provided docking facilities. In those days, the river was large and navigable by ships for some considerable distance; however, the river began silting up some time in the late 18th century. Its flow and size were so badly degraded that shipping was restricted to a few small vessels, but by 1850 it was of no use at all to shipping as it had become no more than a large stream. The port was abandoned altogether by 1900.

The Thaw was used to cool the power station, which led to a small amount of thermal pollution in the river's mouth. The estuary is not natural, because the river was diverted into a channel to allow the power station to be built, similar to the Cadoxton River a few miles east. The river's original mouth was actually slightly further east of here; many lagoons, small pools and salt-marshes are left over from its once large estuary.

== See also ==
- Cadoxton River
- Aberthaw Power Station
