= Margaret Travers Symons =

British suffragette (born 1879 – after 1951)

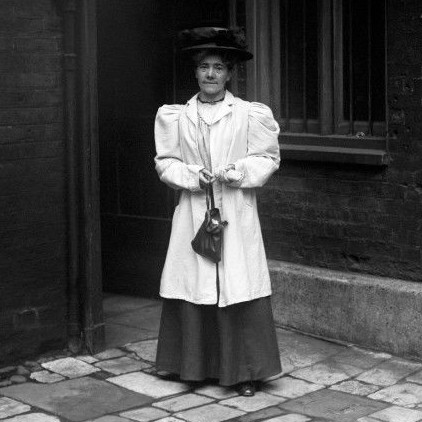
- Born: Margaret Anne Williams; 18 August 1879; Paddington, London, England
- Died: after 1951
- Employer: Keir Hardie
- Known for: First woman to speak in the British House of Commons
- Political party: Labour

Margaret Ann Travers Symons (née Williams; 18 August 1879 – after 1951) was a British suffragette. On 13 October 1908, she became the first woman to speak in the House of Commons when she broke away from her escort into the debating chamber and made an exclamation to the assembly.

== Early life ==
She was born Margaret Anne Williams on 18 August 1879 in Paddington. Her father was Robert Williams, a Welsh architect elected to the London County Council in 1901 and who served on its housing committee. He subsequently lived and worked in Egypt.

In 1902, Margaret married William Travers Symons in Hampstead. She became known as Margaret Travers Symons. The couple had separated by 1906.

== Secretary to Keir Hardie and suffragette ==
Travers Symons became the secretary to the Labour Party politician Keir Hardie. She wrote to the London Evening Standard in April 1906, relaying the anti-war policy of the 7th meeting (in Brussels) of the International Socialist Bureau, which Hardie had attended as a Labour Party delegate.

Hardie was a friend and lover of Sylvia Pankhurst and a supporter of women's suffrage in his own right. They were founding members of the East London Federation of Suffragettes which was a breakaway group of the Women's Social and Political Union (WSPU). Travers Symons was a suffragette and was briefly the treasurer of the WSPU branch in London.

== Incident of 13 October 1908 ==
Travers Symons arranged to be taken around the parliament buildings on 13 October 1908. There was a peephole where women could see into the main chamber. She escaped from her escort, Howell Idris MP, who admitted her on the strength of her father's name, once he had led her to the peephole. She burst into the main chamber of the House of Commons where a debate was in progress on a bill regarding various issues related to children. Reports vary about the exact words she shouted, but they include:

- "Drop your talk about the children's bill and give us votes for women!"
- "Attend to the women's question!"
- "Address the women's issue!"
- "Leave off discussing the children's question and give votes to the women first!"

Travers Symons was removed from the building, but she was not arrested, as the Metropolitan Police had no jurisdiction in the Houses of Parliament. The event was reported in major newspapers: she was the first woman to speak in the House of Commons. She wrote the same day to Idris, assuring him her action was unpremeditated.

That evening, suffragettes were outside parliament, protesting summonses laid against three of their leaders. On this occasion 24 women and 12 men were arrested. Emmeline Pankhurst was arrested later for organising the demonstration and sentenced to three months in prison.

== Aftermath ==
Hardie was much embarrassed by Margaret Travers Symons's actions, though they remained on good terms. At the time, she was not only his personal secretary but was also playing a major role in running Hardie's household. While she was not arrested, the Speaker of the House of Commons imposed a sanction excluding her from the House for two years, and extended this ban to the precincts of Westminster Abbey. Travers Symons continued to work on Hardie's correspondence at his flat, at Nevill's Court off Fetter Lane. She joined the City of London branch of the Independent Labour Party, which sometimes met in the flat. She was arrested in December 1911 with other suffragettes for obstruction, at a demonstration in which stones were thrown, to Hardie's further discomfort.

Travers Symons filed to divorce her husband in 1910 for his adultery, and the divorce was granted in 1911. It was almost a decade later when the first woman was to take her seat after being elected to the British parliament, Nancy Astor, Viscountess Astor, who was elected in 1919 following the relaxation that allowed some women in British elections.

== Later life ==
Travers Symons was still working as secretary to Keir Hardie around 1912–13. She then went to Egypt, working as a journalist and scrutinising British control. She was strongly critical of "Anglicisation": the employment, in the years around World War I, of a higher proportion of civil servants of British origin.

In 1932, Travers Symons attended the inaugural meeting of the Production for Use League, at Friends House. She lived in London after World War II.

== Works ==
- The Riddle of Egypt: A Handbook to the Study of Anglo-Egyptian Affairs (1914)
- Britain and Egypt: The Rise of Egyptian Nationalism (1925)
