= Sutton stone =

Geologic formation in Wales

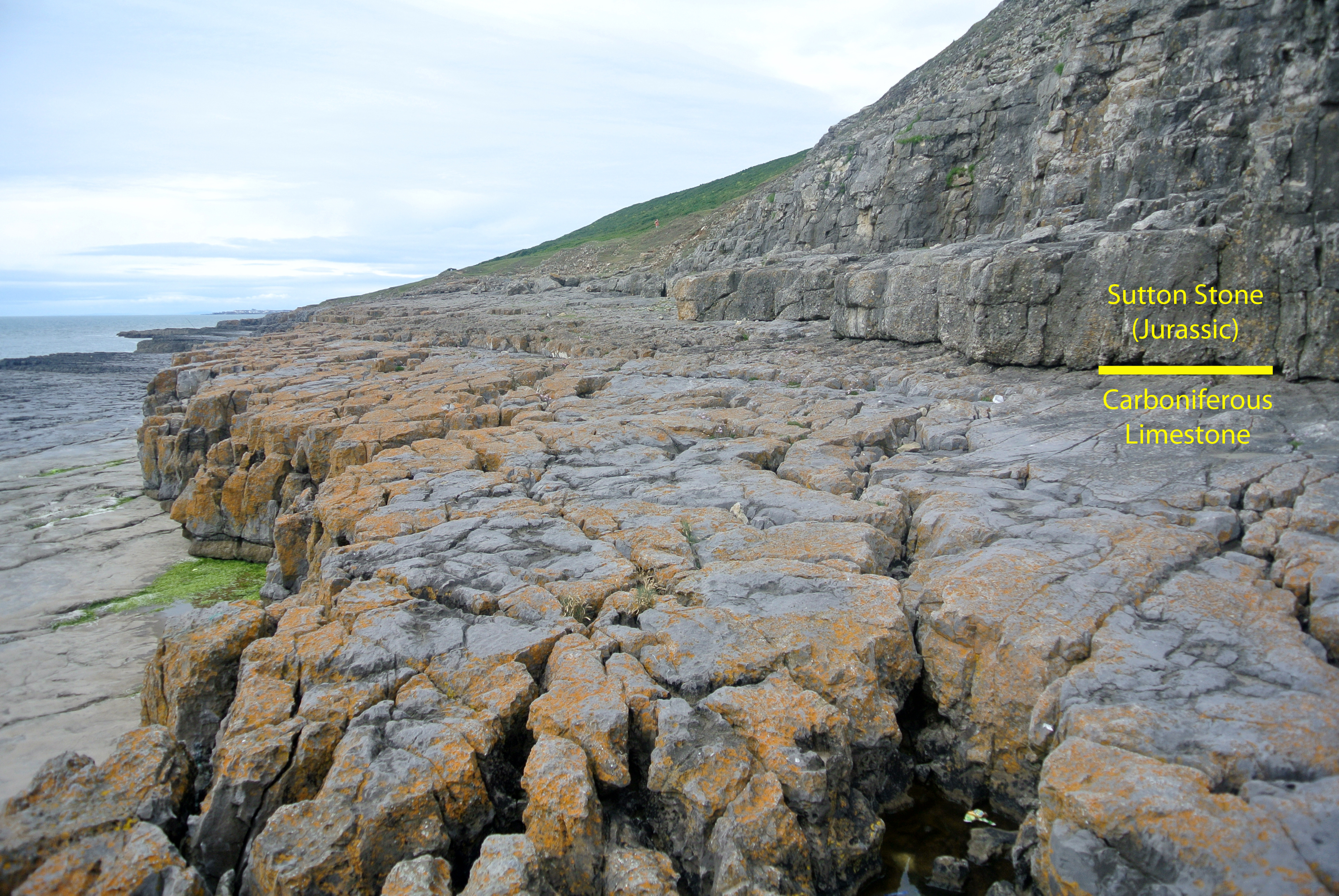
Sutton stone exposed near Ogmore-by-Sea.

Sutton stone is a geologic formation located only in South Wales. Sutton stone consists of white, conglomeratic limestones with pebbles of black chert (silica) and carboniferous limestones, laid down in early Jurassic times. It was named by geologist Henry De la Beche in 1846.
