= Cowbridge Girls School =

Former school in Glamorgan, Wales

Coordinates: 51°27′41.2″N 3°26′24.8″W

- Vale of Glamorgan, Wales; England

Information
- Established: 1896
- Closed: 1974
- Gender: Girls

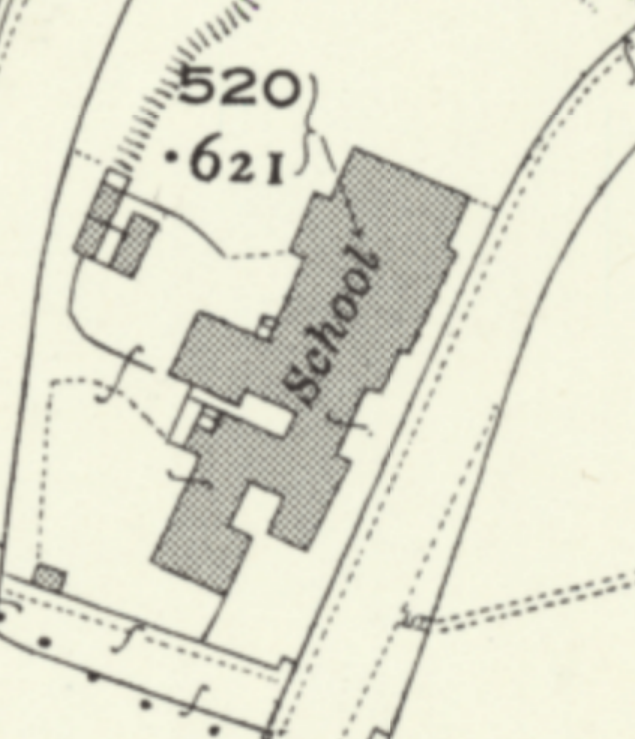
Extract from pre-1914 Ordnance Survey map showing Cowbridge Girls School

Cowbridge Girls School is a former school in the Vale of Glamorgan, Wales. Designed by Robert Williams and built in 1896, it was the first school for girls built under the Welsh Intermediate Education Act 1889 and has been described as the first secondary school for girls in England and Wales. Unusually for a girls' school of the period it was built with a laboratory to allow the girls to study science. The school merged with Cowbridge Comprehensive School in 1974 and the building was used to house the combined school's sixth form until 2010. The building was sold to Hafod housing association in 2018 and in 2022 the Vale of Glamorgan Council granted permission for it to be demolished and replaced with a development of flats and houses, despite a local campaign to preserve it.

== School ==
The school, designed by Welsh architect Robert Williams, was built in 1896 as a result of the Welsh Intermediate Education Act 1889. The act provided state-funded secondary education (then termed intermediate education) to all girls in Wales and resulted in the construction of 95 schools, of which Cowbridge was the first girls' school. Similar provision in England did not come about until the Education Act 1902. The school opened in September 1896 as the Cowbridge Intermediate School for Girls. It has been described as the first secondary school for girls in all of England and Wales. It was one of just two girls' secondary schools built under the 1889 act in the Vale of Glamorgan.

Unusually for a girls' school in this period the building included a science laboratory; girls were typically not permitted to study the subject. The building also included hostel facilities to allow girls from outlying areas to stay overnight. The structure was extended in 1909. When the school merged with Cowbridge Comprehensive School in 1974 to become a co-educational facility, the building was retained as the new school's sixth form college. The former girls' school has been disused since the comprehensive moved to a new site in 2010.

== Redevelopment ==
The school site was owned by the Sir Thomas Mansel Franklen Trust and sold to the Hafod housing association in 2018. In 2018 Hafod submitted a planning application to demolish the school and replace it with a development of 30 flats and 4 houses. The application was held up by concerns raised over ecology, particularly bats, by Natural Resources Wales.

In 2019 a group, Save the Old Girls' School, was founded to campaign for the school building to be retained. The group has worked with national campaign Save Britain's Heritage to propose an alternative development that would convert the school into 23 flats, with adjacent new builds of 12 flats and 2 houses. Cadw considered granting the structure, which the Victorian Society have described as "a beautifully crafted building, solid, handsome and capable of being reused", statutory protection as a listed building. Cadw found the building met the historic importance criteria for listing but that later amendments, such as modern windows, had reduced its architectural value below the threshold. They also considered that better examples of school structures survive from this period.

A petition to save the structure was begun in May 2020 and within six weeks reached the 5,000-signature threshold for debate in the Senedd. The debate was held on 16 February 2022 and had the effect of delaying the planning determination date for the Vale of Glamorgan Council. The Senedd debate concluded with no further action being taken. The planning application was approved at a council planning committee on 8 June 2022. The decision was subject to a judicial review that found in favour of the council in December 2023.
