= Church of St John the Baptist, Llanblethian =

Coordinates: 51.456343°N 3.462327°W

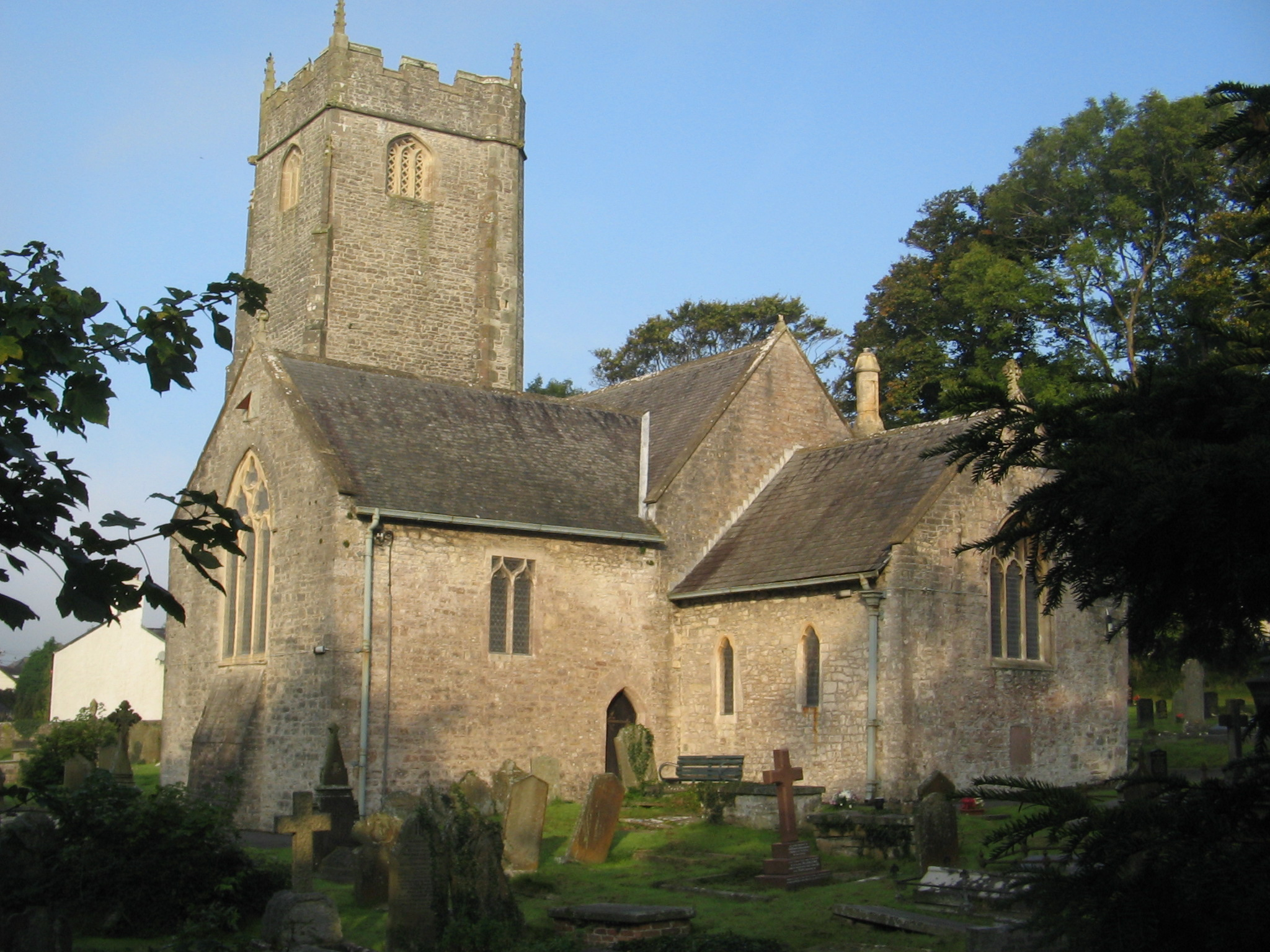
- The Church of St John the Baptist in 2008

- Location in Vale of Glamorgan
- Location: Llanblethian, Vale of Glamorgan
- Country: Wales
- Denomination: Church in Wales
- Website: Church of St John the Baptist

History
- Founded: 12th century
- Dedication: John the Baptist

Architecture
- Heritage designation: Grade I
- Architectural type: Church
- Style: Medieval

The Church of St John the Baptist is a medieval church in Llanblethian in the Vale of Glamorgan, south Wales. Believed to have been built in the 12th century, the church boasts an unusual tower, consistent with the style more common in the south west of England. It underwent extensive restoration in the late 19th century, undertaken by C. B. Fowler of Cardiff. The Church of St John was listed as a Grade I building on 22 February 1963.

== History ==
The Church of St John the Baptist is first documented in a mid 12th century charter which showed it as a possession of Tewkesbury Abbey. Architectural evidence of its age lies in the short, low chancel which is established as 12th century. The west tower is in the Somerset style and was reputedly gifted in 1477, by Lady Anne Neville, heiress to the lordship of Glamorgan and wife of Richard, Duke of Gloucester, later King Richard III of England. An entry in the parish register, dating from 1721, states that Anne was responsible for "the south part of Cowbridge church and St John’s Tower in Cardiff".

In the 1890s the church underwent restoration, conducted by the diocesan architect C. B. Fowler. The interiors were heavily restored, which included removal of the original wall plaster leaving the brickwork and mortar exposed. A benefit of the work was the opening up the fine oak roof, though much of the medieval timbers need to be replaced. During the restoration work the crypt under the vestry was opened and the remains of roughly 200 bodies was discovered. It is unknown if the crypt has been used as an ossuary for bodies moved from the graveyard or a mass burial site from an historical event.

In 1994 Llanblethian church lost its status as the mother church of the parish of Llanblethian and Cowbridge, which was transferred to the neighbouring church at Cowbridge. This past right gave the vicar of Llanblethian oversight of the other churches in the parish including those at Llansannor and Welsh St Donats.

The church was listed as a Grade I building on 22 February 1963, citied as being a 'Medieval parish church with much surviving detail and fine tower'.

== Architecture ==
The original 12th century chancel is located by the single-light window at the north wall, its internal stonework is original. The west tower is in the Somerset style, similar to that of St John the Baptist Church, Cardiff, the oldest medieval church in the capital. The tower stands as an exotic feature to the location with its features similar to those found in Cornwall and Devon, but rarely in Glamorgan. The tower is of two stages with a stepped diagonal buttresses and polygonal NE stair. The tower contains a ring of six bells which were restored and rehung in 1994.

The interiors are heavily restored by C. B. Fowler of Cardiff in 1896–97. Of note within the church is a stone effigy of a man with a greyhound at his feet and a simple but handsome tablet dedicated to the parents of local benefactor Sir Leoline Jenkins, dated 1763. The pulpit is a lavish, multi-coloured pieced designed by fowler and carved by W. Clarke.

== Primary sources ==
- Cowbridge Record Society (2001). Llanblethian Buildings & People. Cowbridge: Cowbridge Record Society. ISBN 0953702928.
- Davies, John; Jenkins, Nigel; Menna, Baines; Lynch, Peredur I., eds. (2008). The Welsh Academy Encyclopaedia of Wales. Cardiff: University of Wales Press. ISBN 978-0-7083-1953-6.
- Newman, John (1995). Glamorgan. London: Penguin Group. ISBN 0140710566.
- Gunter, Maud (1961). "The Manor of Llanblethian". In Williams, Stewart (ed.). The Garden of Wales. Barry: Stewart Williams Publishers.
