= Cowbridge School =

Secondary school in Vale of Glamorgan, Wales

Coordinates: 51.4641°N 3.4375°W

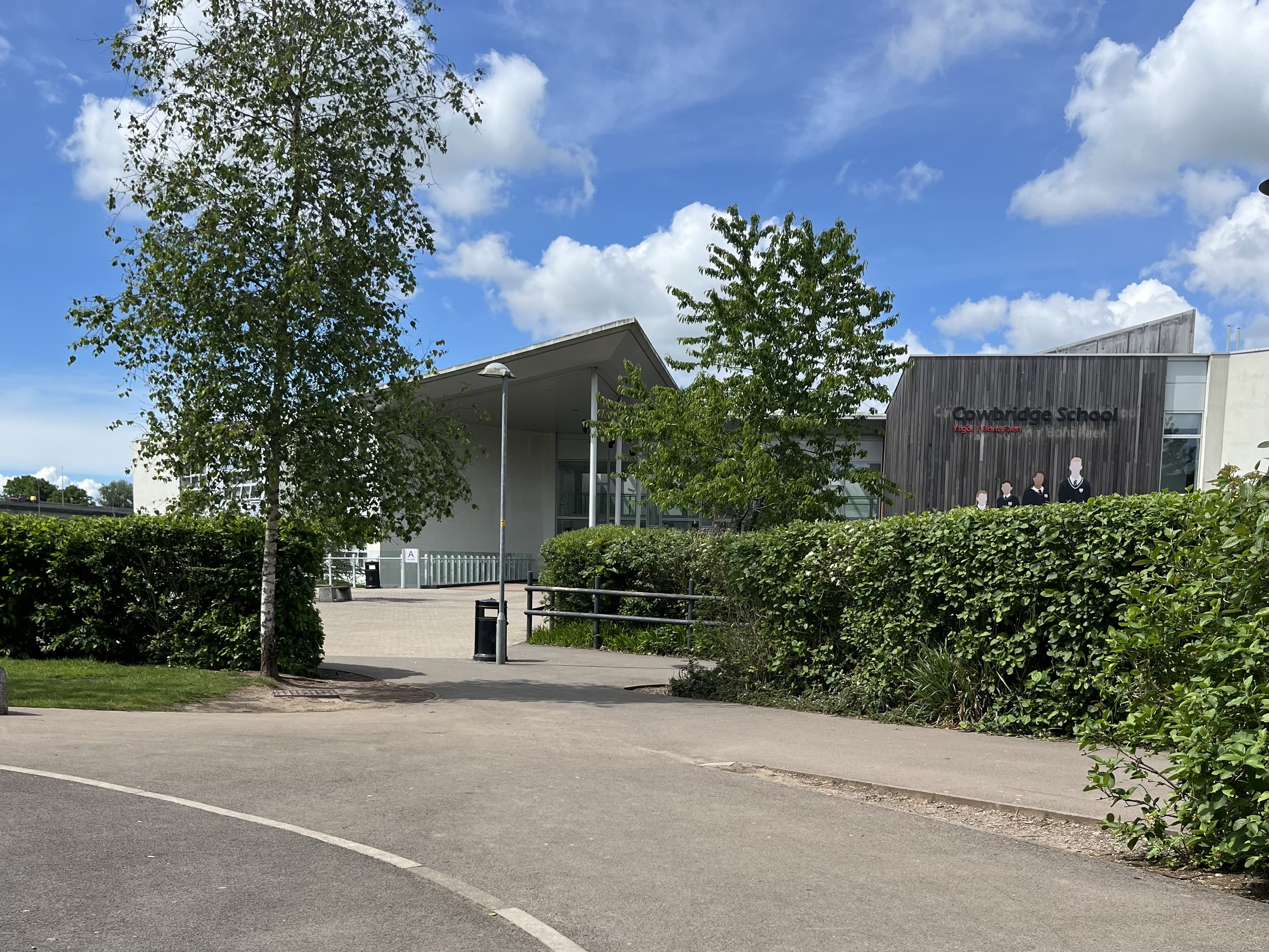
- Aberthin Road, Cowbridge, CF71 7EN; Cowbridge, Vale of Glamorgan; Wales

Information
- Type: Co-educational 3–19 school
- Motto: Education, inspiration and opportunities for life
- Established: 1974; 52 years ago Merger of Cowbridge Girls School and Cowbridge Grammar School
- Local authority: Vale of Glamorgan
- Trust: Sir Thomas Mansel Franklen Trust
- Department for Education URN: 401801 Tables
- Head teacher: Debra Thomas
- Age: 3 to 18
- Enrolment: 1,559
- Colours: Red; Black; White
- National ranking: 1st among Welsh state secondary schools (2026)
- Alumni: Cowbridgians
- Website: http://www.cowbridgeschool.co.uk
- "Cowbridge School Trust, registered charity no. 525559". Charity Commission for England and Wales.

Cowbridge School (formerly Cowbridge Comprehensive School) is a co-educational 3–19 school in Cowbridge, Vale of Glamorgan, Wales. The school traces its history to Cowbridge Grammar School.

The school provides education from nursery and primary through secondary and sixth-form education. It became an all-through 3–19 school in September 2023, following the development of new primary and nursery provision alongside the existing secondary school. The Vale of Glamorgan Council described the development as the first 3–19 "superschool" in the Vale of Glamorgan.

Cowbridge School has been recognised for its academic performance. In the 2026 Sunday Times Parent Power guide, it was named State Secondary School of the Year in Wales and State Secondary School in Wales for Academic Excellence. It was the highest-ranked Welsh state secondary school in the guide, placed joint 143rd in the UK. The ranking was based on the school's 2025 GCSE and A-level results.

== History ==
=== Early period ===
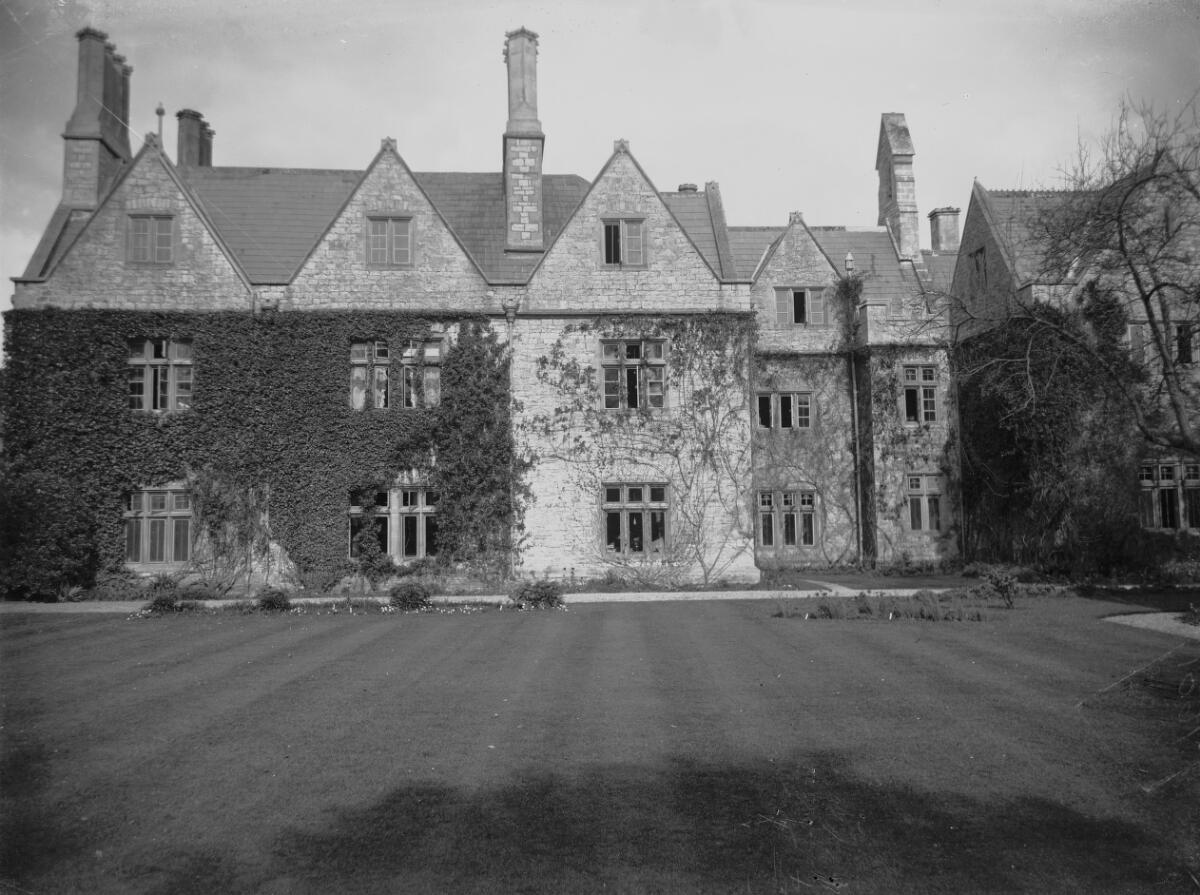
Cowbridge Grammar School, pictured in c. 1900-1910.

Cowbridge School was preceded in the town by Cowbridge Grammar School, which was founded in 1608 by Sir John Stradling, a local landowner and politician. The grammar school was established to provide education in the area and became an important educational institution in Cowbridge.

In 1685, the school became closely associated with Jesus College, Oxford, following its endowment by Sir Leoline Jenkins, a former pupil who became a prominent Welsh lawyer, judge and politician. The Vale of Glamorgan Council records that Cowbridge Grammar School was under the governorship of Jesus College from 1685 to 1919. Jesus College's own historical records also document its long association with the school, describing Cowbridge Grammar School as having been owned by the college from 1685. The relationship connected the grammar school with one of the constituent colleges of the University of Oxford for more than two centuries.

=== Comprehensive school ===
Cowbridge Comprehensive School was established in September 1973, replacing the former grammar school. Initially, its sixth form was located in the former Girls' High School building, while the middle school was situated on Aberthin Road and the lower school was located closer to the centre of Cowbridge.

On 4 December 2008, a fire broke out in a temporary classroom at the lower school at approximately 8:26 am. Around 400 pupils were evacuated to Cowbridge Leisure Centre while firefighters dealt with the incident. No pupils or staff were in the classroom at the time, and the lower school was temporarily closed while the building was made safe.

A major redevelopment subsequently brought the school's secondary provision together on a single site on Aberthin Road. The development, estimated to have cost £21.5 million, included a new main building, refurbishment of existing facilities and the construction of new sports facilities, some of which were made available for community use outside school hours. The new buildings opened to pupils in September 2010. The former middle-school site was subsequently demolished and redeveloped for housing.

In 2013, the Vale of Glamorgan Council transferred the trusteeship of the Cowbridge Comprehensive School Trust to the Sir Thomas Mansel Franklen Trust, continuing an arrangement originating with Cowbridge Grammar School.

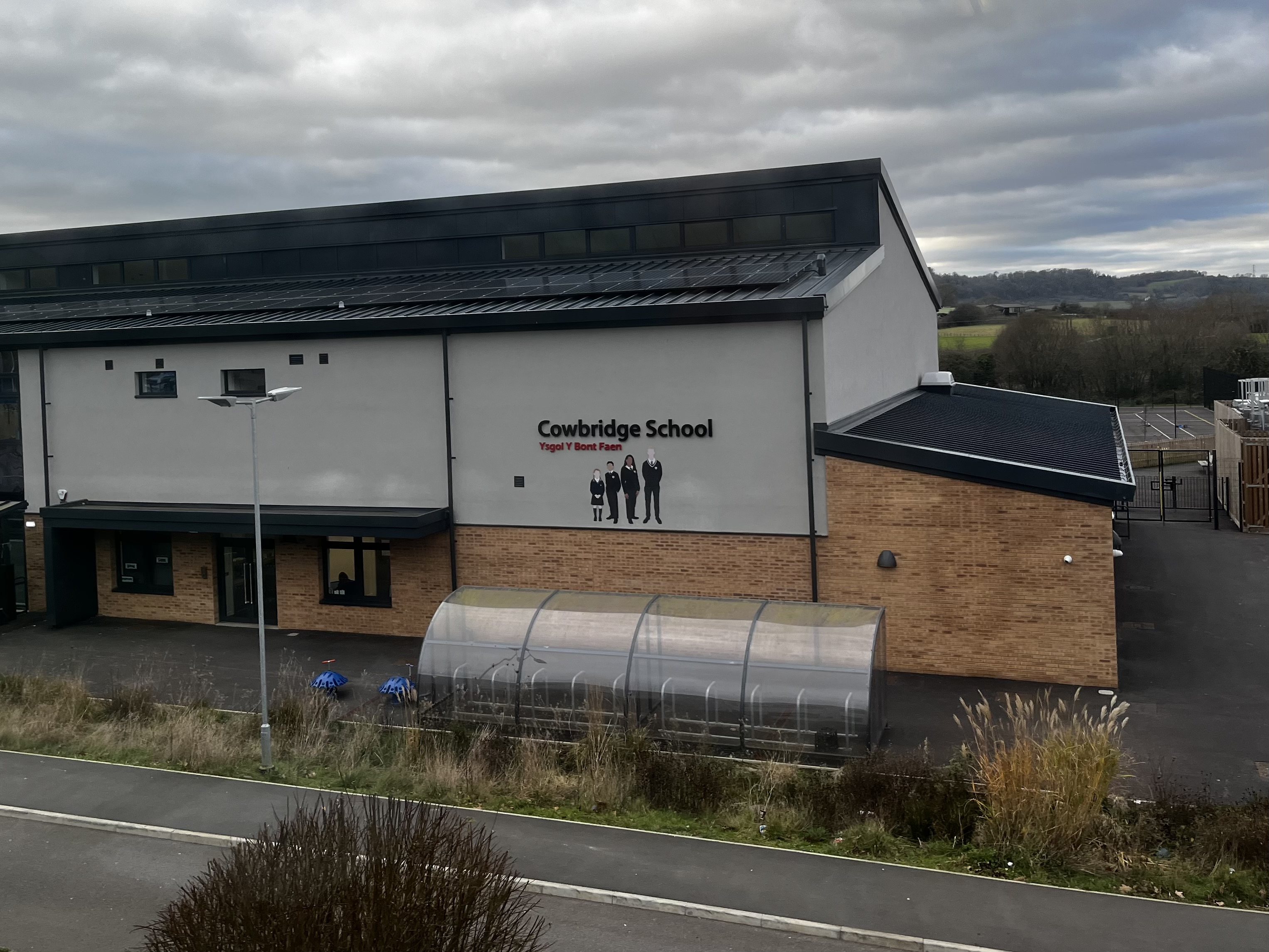
The new primary school building, constructed as part of Cowbridge School's transition to all-through 3–19 provision.

In 2017 the school raised £25,000 towards a new art wing, by selling artworks donated by well-known artists such as Kevin Sinnott and Frank Auerbach.

=== 3–19 school ===
In 2019, proposals were announced to expand the school into an all-through 3–18 school, with new nursery and primary provision on the Aberthin Road site. The development formed part of the Vale of Glamorgan Council's programme to create a 3–19 school and included new primary-school buildings and nursery provision. The new provision opened in September 2023, making Cowbridge School an all-through 3–19 school.

== Facilities ==
Cowbridge School occupies a single-site campus comprising six blocks serving the secondary school and a separate primary school building. The secondary school is organised into A, B, C, D and E blocks, alongside additional facilities across the campus.

A Block contains a theatre and a sports hall. Its north wing houses the humanities and English departments, while the south wing contains science laboratories. The lower floor provides design and technology facilities, alongside facilities for additional learning needs (ALN), physical education, music and drama. The Learning Resource Centre, formerly the school's main library, was converted into a computer laboratory. The school has Wi-Fi throughout the campus.

B Block houses the Welsh department on its lower floor and modern foreign languages on the upper floor. C Block accommodates geography and mathematics, with mathematics occupying both floors. D Block is dedicated to art, while E Block contains the main canteen for pupils in Years 7–11 and a separate sixth-form dining and study area known as "Scholars". The upper floor of E Block contains computer suites and office accommodation.

Outdoor facilities include multi-use games areas (MUGAs) and a 4G artificial-turf pitch. The school campus also incorporates approximately 27 acres of open land.

== Academic reputation ==
=== Rankings ===
Cowbridge School has received recognition for its academic performance in national school rankings. In the 2025 Sunday Times Parent Power guide, it was named State Secondary School of the Year in Wales and State Secondary School of the Year in Wales for Academic Excellence. It received both distinctions again in the 2026 guide, when it was ranked 143rd nationally and was the highest-ranked state secondary school in Wales.

In 2025, 47.1% of GCSE entries at Cowbridge School were graded A*–A, while 74.5% of A-level entries were graded A*–B.

=== 2026 Estyn Inspection ===
In its 2026 inspection, Estyn described Cowbridge School as a caring and ambitious school where most pupils made secure progress. It identified strengths in pupils' behaviour, wellbeing and extracurricular provision, particularly in music, sport and the performing arts. Areas for improvement included attendance, foundation learning, and ensuring that Year 9 pupils have access to the full range of learning experiences required by the Curriculum for Wales. The inspection also found that the school did not fully comply with statutory guidance on promoting healthy eating and drinking.

The inspection identified concerns about site security and access. At the time, sixth-form pupils were permitted to park on the school site, while monitoring of access was limited and there was no consistent sign-in and sign-out procedure. Estyn considered these arrangements to present potential safety concerns; the issues were subsequently addressed.
