= Economy of Aberdeen =

Aberdeen is one of the most prosperous cities in Scotland owing to the variety and importance of its chief industries. Traditionally Aberdeen was home to fishing, textile mills, ship building and paper making. These industries have mostly gone and have been replaced with high technology developments in the electronics design and development industry, research in agriculture and fishing, and the oil industry which has been largely responsible for Aberdeen's economic boom in the last three decades.

== Traditional (pre 1970) ==
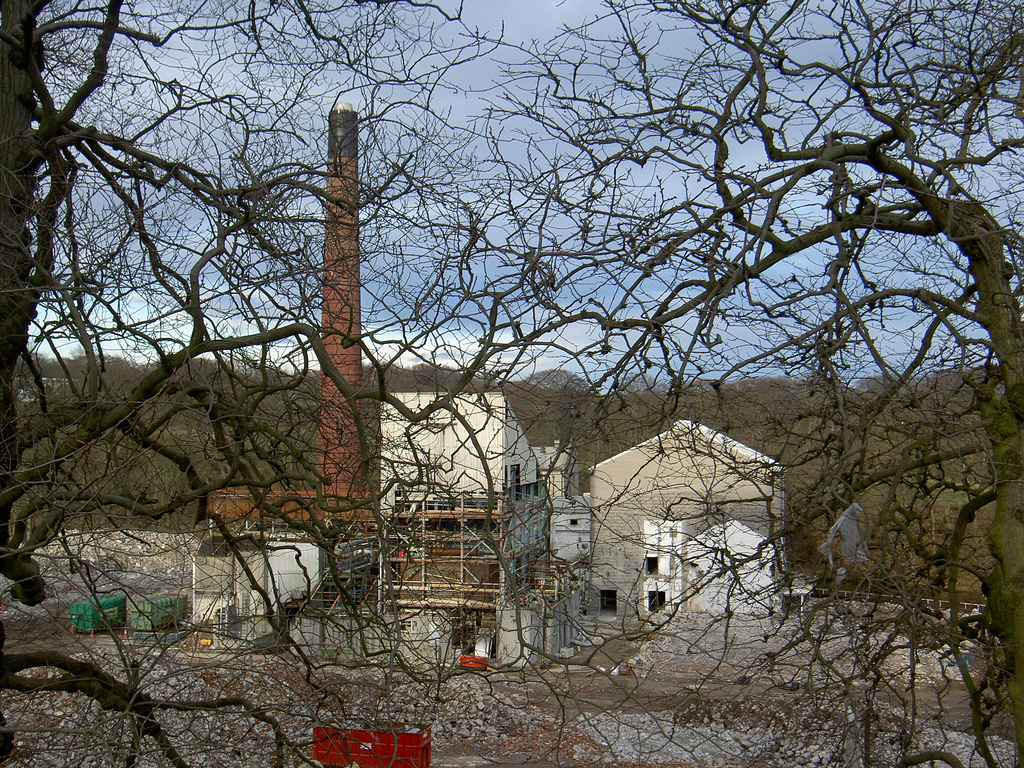
Donside Paper Mill under demolition, 15 February 2006

Most of the leading pre-1970s industries date from the 18th Century, amongst them woollens (1703), linen (1749), and cotton (1779). These gave employment to several thousands of operatives. The paper-making industry is one of the most famous and oldest in the city, paper having been first made in Aberdeen in 1694. The industry has however, collapsed. Culter Paper Mill closed in 1981, Donside Paper Mill closed in 2001 and the Davidson Mill (run by BPB Paperboard) in 2005. Flax-spinning and jute and combmaking factories also flourished, along with successful foundries and engineering works.

== Granite ==
Very durable grey granite was quarried at Rubislaw quarry for more than 300 years, and blocked and dressed paving "setts", kerb and building stones, and monumental and other ornamental work of granite have long been exported from the district to all parts of the world. The terraces of the Houses of Parliament and Waterloo Bridge in London were built from Aberdeen granite. Quarrying finally ceased in 1971.

Kemnay Quarry granite has been used in many buildings and structures, including Princes Street, Edinburgh and The Forth Railway Bridge.

== Fishing ==
Fishing, though once the predominant industry, was surpassed by the deep-sea fisheries, which derived a great impetus from improved technologies throughout the 20th Century. Lately, however, catches have fallen due to overfishing in previous years, and the use of the harbour by oil support vessels. Aberdeen remains an important fishing port, but the catch landed there is now eclipsed by the more northerly ports of Peterhead and Fraserburgh. The Fisheries Research Services is based in Aberdeen, including its headquarters and a marine research lab.

== Agriculture research ==
Aberdeen is well regarded for the agricultural and soil research that takes place at The Macaulay Institute, which has close links to the city's two universities. The Rowett Research Institute is a research centre for studies into food and nutrition located in Aberdeen, it has produced three Nobel laureates and there is a high concentration of life scientists working in the city.
