= Cowbridge with Llanblethian =

Cowbridge with Llanblethian: Welsh: Y Bont-faen Llanfleiddan
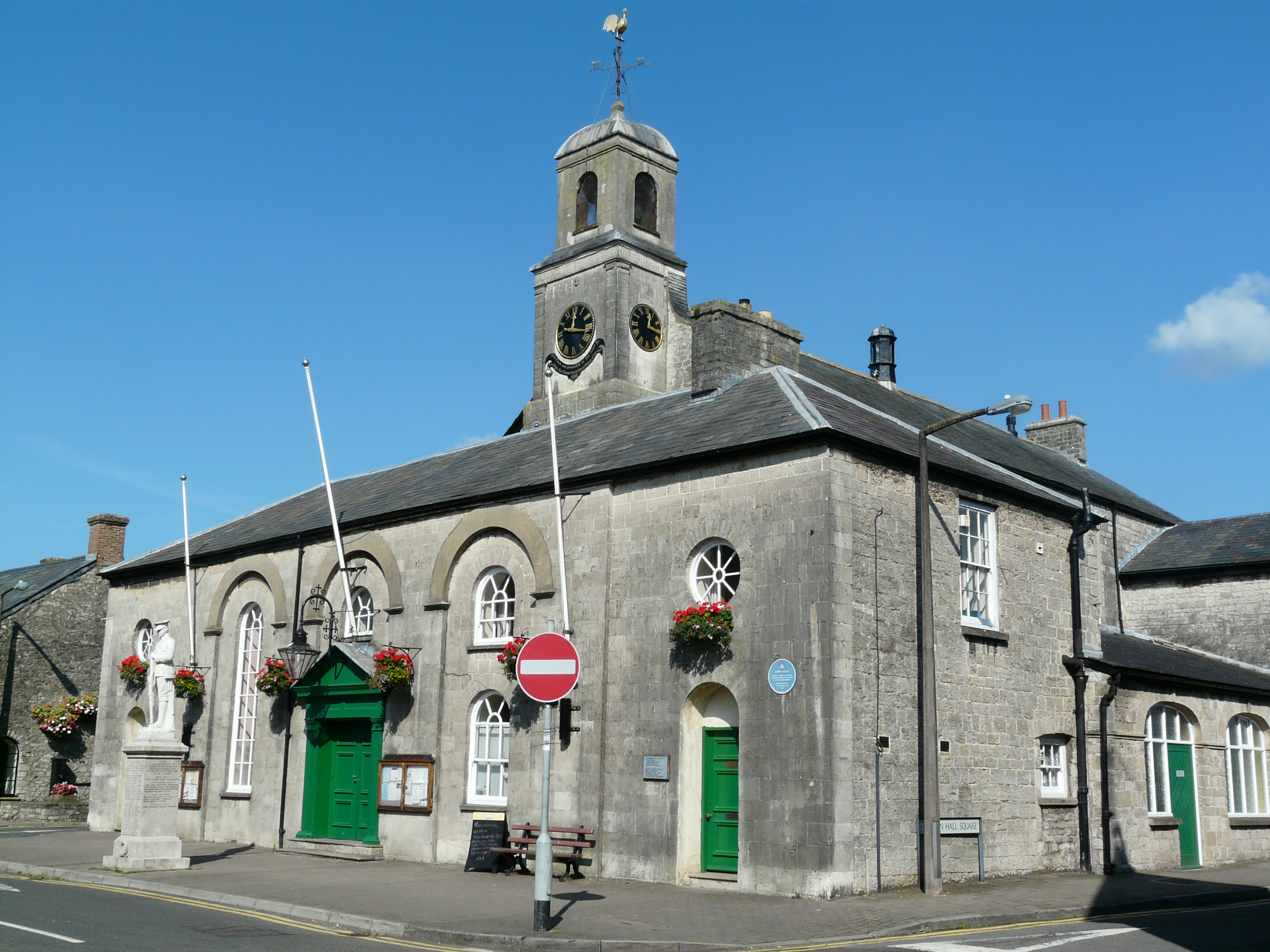
- Cowbridge Town Hall

- Location within the Vale of Glamorgan
- Population: 4,063
- OS grid reference: SS986741
  - Cardiff: 13.4 miles (21.6 km)
  - London: 170.2 miles (273.9 km)
- Community: Cowbridge with Llanblethian
- Principal area: Vale of Glamorgan
- Preserved county: South Glamorgan
- Country: Wales
- Sovereign state: United Kingdom
- Post town: COWBRIDGE
- Postcode district: CF71
- Dialling code: 01446
- Police: South Wales
- Fire: South Wales
- Ambulance: Welsh
- UK Parliament: Vale of Glamorgan
- Senedd Cymru – Welsh Parliament: Vale of Glamorgan
- List of places UK Wales Vale of Glamorgan 51.4592°N 3.4483°W Map of the community

Cowbridge with Llanblethian is a community in the Vale of Glamorgan, Wales, which incorporates Llanblethian and the town of Cowbridge. It also covers the village of Aberthin to the northeast of Cowbridge. The population was 4,063 in 2011.

Cowbridge was granted a Royal Charter in 1886 which allowed the population of the community to elect its own councillors and mayor. The first Mayor was Alderman Thomas Rees, in 1887. Currently (2016) the Mayor of Cowbridge and Llanblethian is Councillor David Morris.

The community elects Cowbridge Town Council (full name Cowbridge (Ancient Borough) with Llanblethian Town Council) with a total of 15 councillors. The Council meets in the Council Chamber of Cowbridge Town Hall.

The community is covered by the Cowbridge electoral ward for elections to the Vale of Glamorgan Council.

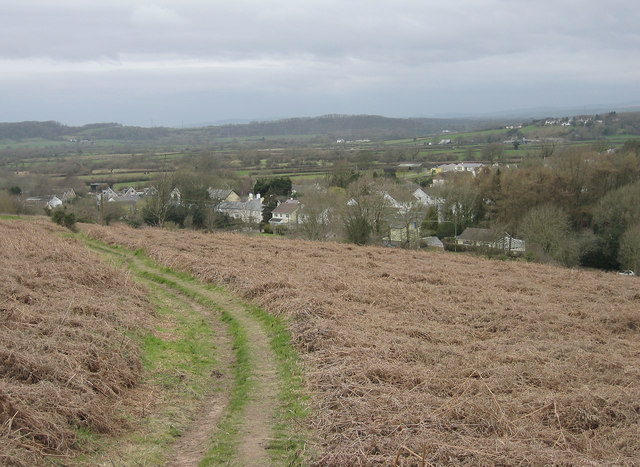
View towards Aberthin

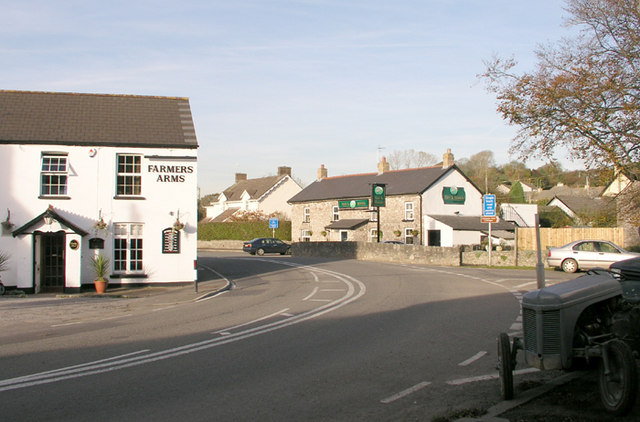
Aberthin village

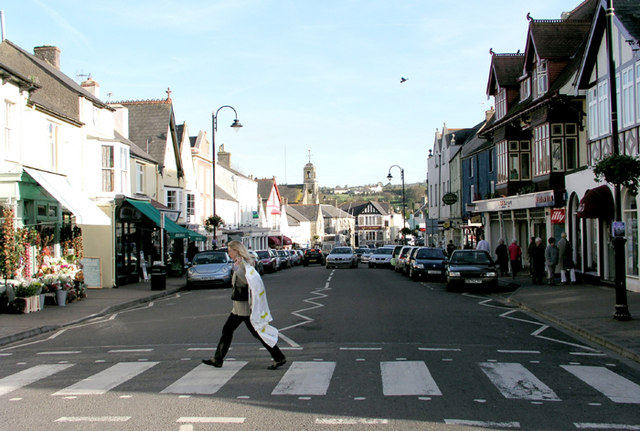
High Street, Cowbridge

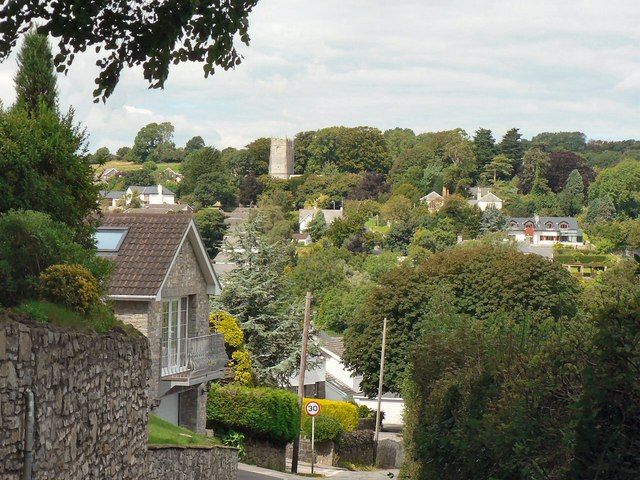
Llanblethian
