= Cowbridge =

Town in the Vale of Glamorgan, Wales

Coordinates: 51.4605°N 3.4480°W

Cowbridge: Welsh: Y Bont-faen
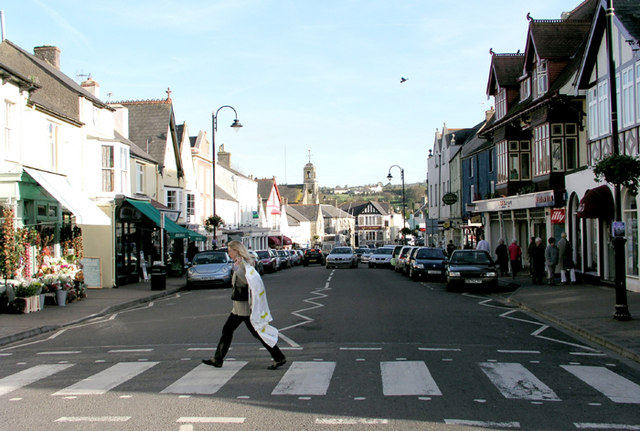
- Cowbridge High Street

- Location within the Vale of Glamorgan
- Population: 4,063 (community 2011)
- OS grid reference: SS995745
- Community: Cowbridge with Llanblethian
- Principal area: Vale of Glamorgan
- Preserved county: South Glamorgan
- Country: Wales
- Sovereign state: United Kingdom
- Post town: COWBRIDGE
- Postcode district: CF71
- Dialling code: 01446
- Police: South Wales
- Fire: South Wales
- Ambulance: Welsh
- UK Parliament: Vale of Glamorgan
- Senedd Cymru – Welsh Parliament: Pen-y-bont Bro Morgannwg

Cowbridge (Welsh: Y Bont-faen) is a market town in the Vale of Glamorgan, Wales, approximately 12 miles (19 km) west of the centre of Cardiff.

The Cowbridge with Llanblethian community and civil parish elect a town council. A Cowbridge electoral ward exists for elections to the Vale of Glamorgan Council. This ward includes Cowbridge, Llanblethian and Llanfair.

The total population of the ward taken at the 2011 census was 6,180.

== Toponymy ==
The town is first recorded as Pontyfon, (with mon or fon meaning 'cow' in Old Welsh), and as Pontyfuwch ('bridge of the cow' in modern Welsh) by 1645. The modern Welsh name, Y Bont-faen, translates as 'the stone bridge'. The English name is a direct translation of the older Welsh name of the town.

== History ==
=== Roman times ===
The town lies on the site of a Roman settlement identified by some scholars as the fort of Bovium (cow-place). Recent excavations have revealed extensive Roman settlement; the town lies alongside a Roman road.

=== Middle Ages ===
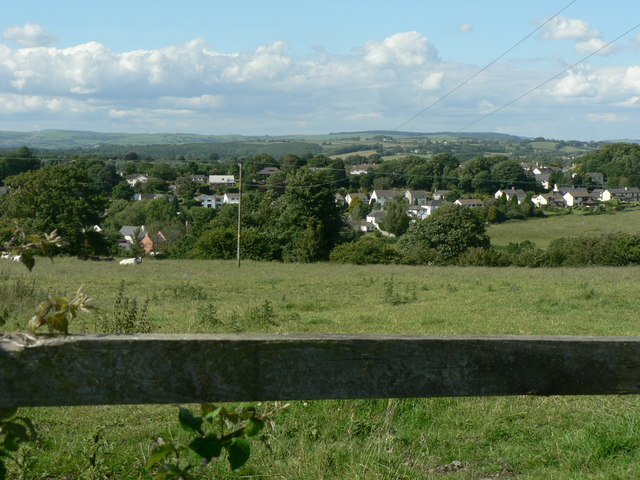
Llanblethian (June 2008)

The town centre is arranged on its medieval plan, with one long street divided into "burgage plots". It is one of very few medieval walled towns in Wales, and substantial portions of the walls, together with the south gate, are still standing. On 13 March 1254, Cowbridge received its first borough charter from Richard de Clare, the Lord of Glamorgan. Richard de Clare was one of the most powerful Barons of the day, having huge estates stretching across much of south Wales and also lands in southeast England.

The town walls were built sometime in the latter half of the 13th century. From 1243, de Clare was actively extending his authority in Glamorgan. In 1245, he seized the manors of Llanblethian, Ruthin and Talyfan from Richard Siward, and the lordships of Miskin and Glynrhondda from Hywel ap Maredudd. In Llanblethian he founded the town of Cowbridge and in Miskin he founded the castle and town of Llantrisant. The largely medieval church of the Holy Cross was initially a chapel of ease to the parish church at Llanblethian. In 1307 Earl Gilbert de Clare, grandson of Richard de Clare, began work on the stone fortifications of St Quintins Castle in Llanblethian.

The Battle of Stalling Down was fought near Cowbridge between an English army, serving Henry IV of England and a combined force of French and Welsh soldiers under Owain Glyndŵr in 1403. Details of the battle, its exact site and its outcome are scant, but the site has been recognised by Cadw for possible inclusion in a Register of Historic Battlefields in Wales.

=== Georgian times ===
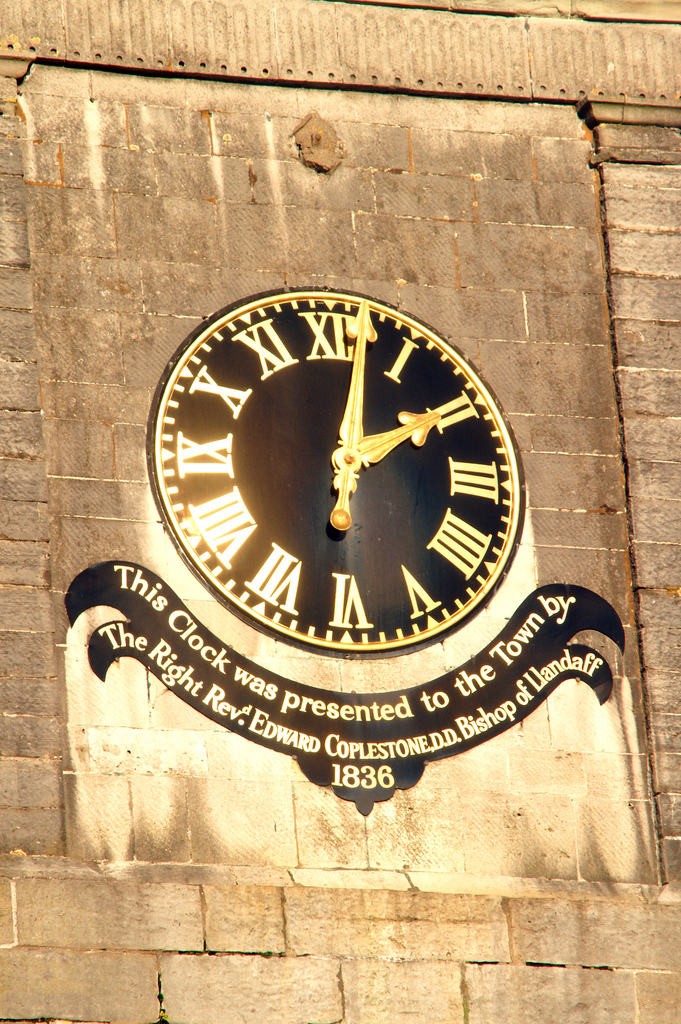
Cowbridge clock tower presented by the Bishop of Llandaff in 1836

The 18th century antiquary, Iolo Morganwg, inventor of the present-day rituals of the National Eisteddfod of Wales, kept a bookshop in the High Street, the location of which is now marked with a plaque inscribed with the words Y Gwir yn erbyn y Byd ("Truth against the world") in Roman and Coelbren y Beirdd script. It was just outside the town that he held the first meeting of the Gorsedd, an assembly of bards, in 1795. Cowbridge Grammar School was founded in 1608 and had close links with Jesus College, Oxford through its later benefactor, Dr Leoline Jenkins. Its famous pupils included the poet Alun Lewis and the actor Sir Anthony Hopkins. The old grammar school eventually merged with Cowbridge High School for Girls to become a comprehensive school, and the original buildings, having for some time lain derelict, have been converted into private accommodation.

=== Notable buildings ===
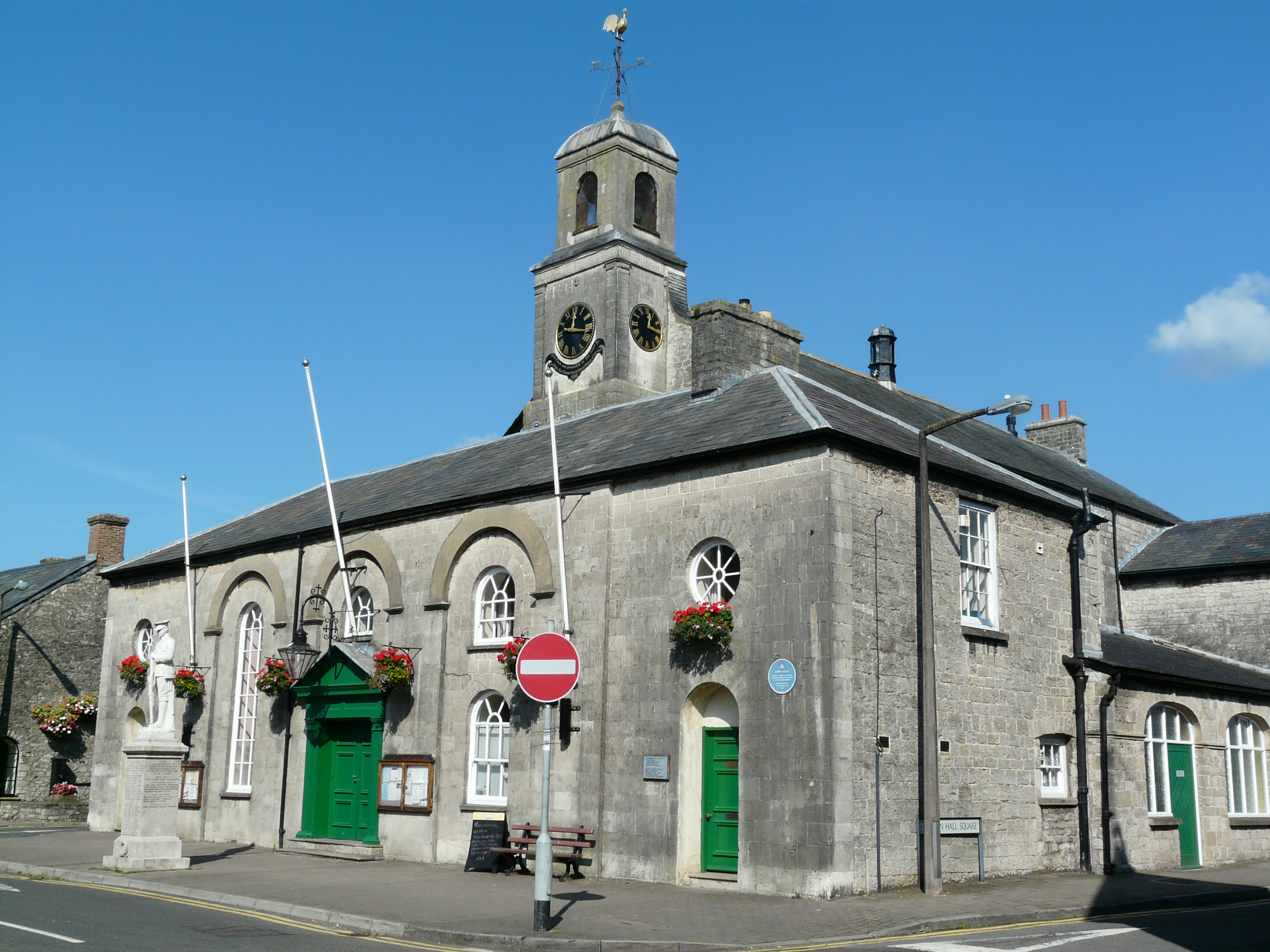
Cowbridge Town Hall

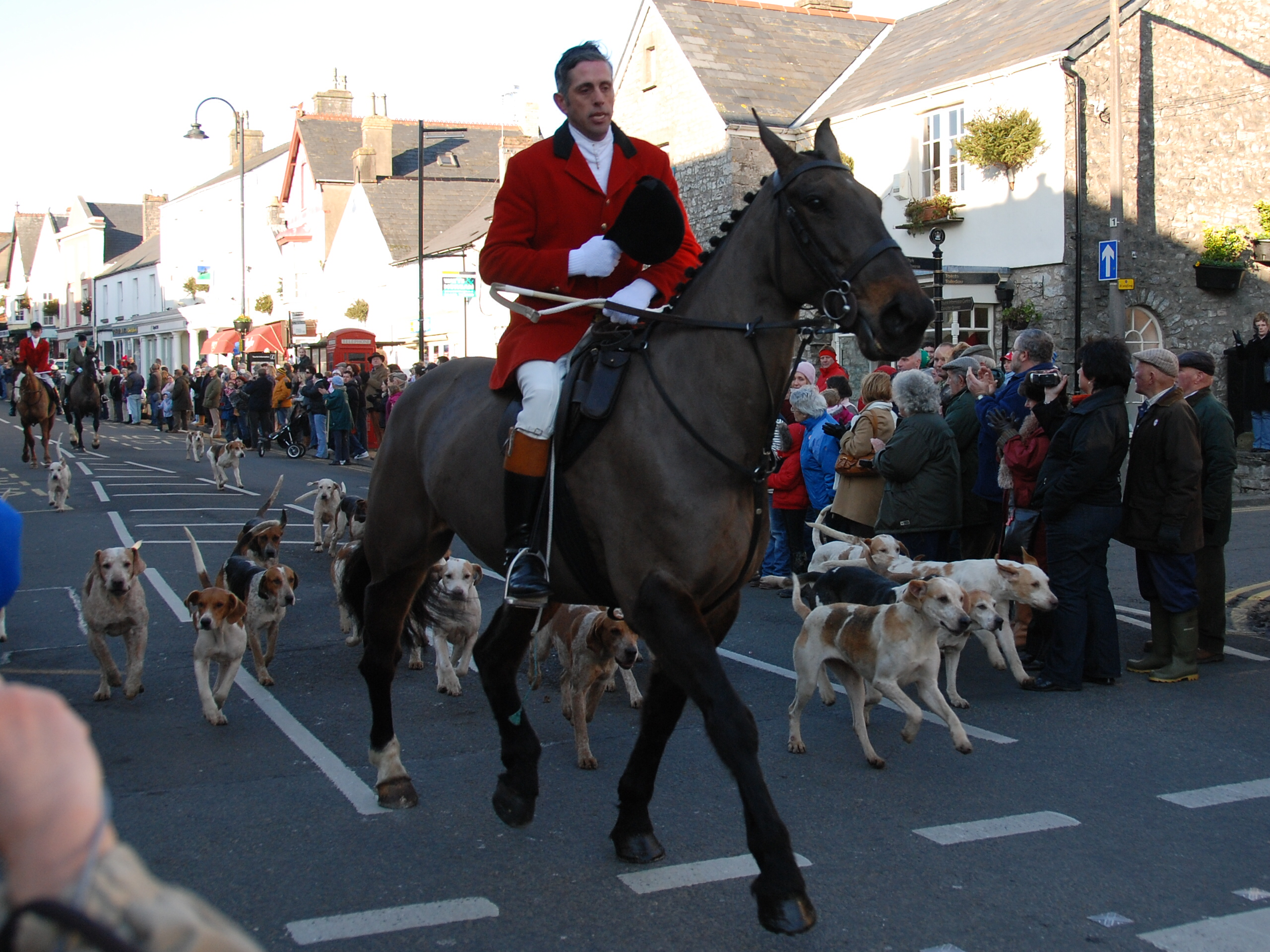
Boxing Day Hunt in Cowbridge

The present Cowbridge Town Hall, a building whose foundations date back perhaps as far as the Elizabethan era, served as a prison until 1830, when it was converted into a town hall to replace the former guildhall, demolished at that date. The conversion was completed in 1830 by Isaiah Verity of Ash Hall who in gratitude was made a Freeman of Cowbridge.

Eight of the original prison cells are still intact, six of which house the exhibits of Cowbridge Museum. The remainder of the building is used by the town council and for public events. The museum holds archaeological finds from Cowbridge and district, as well as displays on the later history of the town, including industrial and domestic artefacts, a photographic collection, and a small historical costume collection.

The main street contains a number of Georgian houses, including the former town houses of important local families such as the Edmondes and Carnes. The Carnes' town house is known as Great House, a Grade II* listed property of Medieval origin.

=== Modern times ===
Cowbridge contains the following inns: the Bear Hotel, the Horse and Groom, the Edmondes Arms, the Duke of Wellington and the Vale of Glamorgan. The latter is located at the premises of the former Vale of Glamorgan Brewery.

Closely attached to the town of Cowbridge is the village of Aberthin. Aberthin contains two inns; The Hare and Hounds and The Farmers Arms.

Cowbridge once had a railway station, which opened in 1865 and closed in 1951.

On the 21 March 1950 a Bristol Freighter (Registration: G-AHJJ) on a test flight took off from Bristol Filton Airport. The aircraft crashed near Cowbridge after a structural failure of the fuselage. It caused the aircraft to enter spin and crash. The accident killed all four passengers and crew on board.

Cowbridge was named one of the best places to live in Wales in 2017.

== Schools ==
Cowbridge Grammar School (founded 1608, closed 1974) was merged with other local schools to form Cowbridge Comprehensive School in 1973–74. The disused main building on Town Mill Road was converted to residences in 2006–08 and its associated prefabricated classrooms replaced by housing in 2013.

Cowbridge Girls School, (previously known as Cowbridge Intermediate School for Girls) was built in 1896 and was the first school for girls built in Wales after the Welsh Intermediate Education Act (1889) provided for state-funding of education for all children. It included a hostel for boarders (funded by philanthropist John Bevan, a Cowbridge solicitor) so that girls could attend from a wider area. The school building was designed by Robert Williams. It was built from dressed limestone in a baronial style. It was extended in 1909, designed by Rhys S. Griffiths to match with the original building and this included a science laboratory, gym and more hostel accommodation as well as additional classrooms. At the formation of Cowbridge Comprehensive School in 1973-4 its building was used for the sixth form. When new buildings meant the whole school could be brought together on one site, it was unused after 2010. Proposals to demolish the building, or alternatively convert it and surrounding space to new housing, were made between 2018 and 2020. A request for it to be listed by Cadw was rejected because of lack of distinctiveness in the building and some modern alterations.

=== Secondary schools ===
Cowbridge School is an English-medium secondary school. As of 2021, the school had approximately 1528 pupils. It is one of the best performing secondary schools in Wales. It achieved 94% A*-C at GCSE in 2010. The school was located on three sites, with the Lower School in the south-west of the town and Middle School and Sixth Form in the north-east. Cowbridge Comprehensive School completed a major redevelopment in September 2010 to bring the entire school to one site (the former Middle School/Sixth Form site) using Welsh Assembly Government funding.

In September 2010, the new school was officially opened to students. All students can now be found on the one site, instead of the three separate buildings that were all situated in different locations in Cowbridge. The former sixth form site on Aberthin Road is now derelict and awaiting redevelopment.

=== Primary schools ===
Y Bontfaen Primary School is an English-medium school situated in Borough Close. As of 2021, it has a roll of 279 pupils.

Ysgol Iolo Morganwg is a Welsh-medium school situated in Broadway. As of June 2022, there were 203 pupils on roll, with 73.4% coming from Welsh-speaking homes.

== Sport ==
Cowbridge is home to Welsh Rugby Union team Cowbridge RFC which fields two senior teams, a youth team and a ladies team. Cowbridge Cricket Club, part of the Cowbridge and District Athletic Club, first played in 1840. The club now has six teams and is affiliated to the South Wales Cricket Association, Cricket Wales and the South Wales Premier Cricket League. Notable cricketers who have played for the club include former test players Hugh Morris, John Clay, Tony Lewis, C F Walters and on one famous occasion Douglas Jardine. Among the many county cricketers produced by the club are the Glamorgan players Ben Wright and Alex Jones. Glamorgan CCC played county fixtures at Cowbridge in the 1930s. The club's 1st XI won the Dan Radcliffe Cup in 2019 as Champions of the South Wales Cricket Association with Christopher Willey as the captain. Ben Wright scored a club record 1,395 runs in the season.

Cowbridge has a leisure centre with tennis, football and badminton clubs. Behind Cowbridge Leisure Centre is Cowbridge Bowling Club and tennis courts.

September 2009 also saw the reintroduction of senior football to Cowbridge Town FC after a ten-year absence. Starting in the third tier of the Vale of Glamorgan Amateur Football League the team achieved great success in their first season back, achieving an unlikely cup-promotion double. The 2011–12 season saw the club gain their second promotion in three years to reach the premier division.

== Cultural activities ==
Cowbridge is home to the Cowbridge Amateur Dramatic Society (CADS), based at the Market Theatre. CADS was formed in 1947 and aims to stage three main productions each year. The Society also publishes a newsletter, "The Thespian", three or four times each year.

Until 1997, when it 'outgrew' the Town Hall stage, Cowbridge was home to the Cowbridge Amateur Operatic Society (CAOS). Founded by a small group of enthusiasts, its first production was "The Pirates of Penzance" in 1969. CAOS continued its Gilbert and Sullivan theme until 1974, when the show of the year was "Die Fledermaus". Still going strong, CAOS is now based at Llantwit Major.

Since 2004, the town has hosted the annual Cowbridge Food and Drink Festival. Currently, the festival takes place in late spring having originally taken place every October. The festival incorporates various food and drink exhibitors, food court and fringe festival. Many of the town's inns hold beer, ale and cider events.

In 2010 the Cowbridge Music Festival was founded which takes place every autumn in various venues throughout the town. The festival is made up of classical music, jazz and folk music and boasts an excellent outreach programme. In 2014 the acclaimed violinist Nicola Benedetti became the festival's patron.

Cowbridge History Society was created in 2013 out of a merger between the former Cowbridge & District Local History Society (founded in the 1970s) and Cowbridge Record Society, publishers of several books on the topics relating to the history of the town. It holds monthly meetings at the Town Hall throughout the winter and funds a Local History Studies Room (the "Jeff Alden Room") containing archival material.

== Notable residents ==
- Ieuan Evans, former Wales rugby union player and rugby commentator
- Leoline Jenkins, seventeenth-century politician and judge
- Caryl Parry Jones, singer and actress
- Ernest William Jones, international chartered shipbroker and cricketer for Glamorgan and Wales
- Stephen McPhail, Irish international and former Cardiff City football player
- Nicky Piper, former boxer
- Anneka Rice, television presenter
- Nia Roberts, television and radio presenter
- James William Webb-Jones, choral educator

Notable people who attended school in Cowbridge include:

- James Frost, singer and guitarist of The Automatic.
- Iwan Griffiths, drummer of The Automatic.
- Patrick Hannan, political journalist
- Robin Hawkins, lead singer and bassist of Welsh rock band 'The Automatic'.
- Frances Hoggan, First woman doctor to be registered in Wales.
- Anthony Hopkins, Oscar-winning actor
- Alun Lewis, poet
- Garfield Owen Welsh footballer of the 1950s and 1960s
- Rhian Wilkinson, Olympic football player

== Twinning ==
Cowbridge is twinned with Clisson in the Loire-Atlantique department in northwestern France.

== See also ==
- Cowbridge Physic Garden
