= St Mary Church Road railway station =

Former railway station in Wales

St Mary Church Road

General information
- Location: St Mary Church, Vale of Glamorgan; Wales
- Coordinates: 51.4345°N 3.4117°W
- Platforms: 1

Other information
- Status: Disused

History
- Original company: Taff Vale Railway
- Post-grouping: Great Western Railway

Key dates
- 1 October 1892: opened
- 3 May 1930: closed to passengers
- 1 November 1932: closed to goods
Location

St Mary Church Road railway station was a railway station in the Vale of Glamorgan, South Wales.

== Description ==
The station was one of the three original stations opened on the Cowbridge and Aberthaw Railway. It served the village of St Mary Church, which was about a mile to the west, and also served a number of other smaller settlements, none of which were particularly close to the railway. The station consisted of a single platform with a building of red and yellow bricks. It was of a similar design to the one at Cowbridge, but smaller. It had a goods-loop opposite the platform. The station was fully signalled and the signal box was located on the platform beside the passenger building. St Mary Church Road was the only station on the Cowbridge-Aberthaw line to be signaled. The remainder of the line was worked on the 'one engine in steam' principle.

== History ==
Like the rest of the stations between Cowbridge and Aberthaw Low Level, St Mary Church Road was underused from the outset. The signal box was closed in 1900 and the station was without signals from then on. The loop was retained as a siding and new ground-frames were added to control it.

== Closure ==
The passenger service ended in 1930. Goods facilities lasted for another two years but they themselves were very meagre. Goods came mostly from private sidings, but by the 1930s, the limeworking facilities at Aberthaw and Greldaw were closed. The Aberthaw Cement Works sent most of its traffic by the Vale of Glamorgan Line and the limeworks at St Athan sent only small amounts of traffic by rail. By 1932, the station handled just a small amount of agricultural traffic. The Great Western Railway duly closed the station on 1 November 1932. After closure, the stationmaster, Mr Billy Lewis, was transferred to Ystradowen.

== The site today ==
Although most traces of the station are gone, the red and yellow station building and signal box are still in situ. The site is now used for agricultural purposes.

== Notes ==
Preceding station	Disused railways	Following station
St Hilary Platform	Taff Vale Railway; Llantrisant-Aberthaw	Llanbethery Platform
