= St Athan Road railway station =

Former railway station in Wales

St Athan Road

General information
- Location: St Athan, Vale of Glamorgan; Wales
- Coordinates: 51.4011°N 3.3944°W
- Platforms: 1

Other information
- Status: Disused

History
- Original company: Cowbridge and Aberthaw Railway
- Pre-grouping: Taff Vale Railway
- Post-grouping: Great Western Railway

Key dates
- 1 October 1892: station opens
- 5 May 1930: station closes
Location

St Athan Road railway station served the village of St Athan in the Vale of Glamorgan in South Wales.

== History ==
The station was built by the Cowbridge and Aberthaw Railway, and opened along with the line on 1 October 1892. As with St Mary Church Road, the preceding station on the line, St Athan Road was not very near the village it served, lying about a mile to the east. It also saw traffic from Llancadle, Aberthaw and Gileston.

From the start, St Athan Road was little-used. The line had been built with the intention of serving a new port at Aberthaw. When the plans for the port were abandoned, the Cowbridge and Aberthaw Railway fell swiftly into financial trouble and had to be absorbed by the Taff Vale Railway in 1895.

St Athan Road closed on 5 May 1930. The station staff were withdrawn and their remaining duties were transferred to the staff of Gileston station.

== Crime ==
Two thefts occurred at St Athan Road in 1906. In March of that year, four and a half pence was stolen. In June, the stationmaster's watch was stolen.

== Similarly named stations ==
For at least part of its life, Gileston railway station on the Vale of Glamorgan Line was known as 'Gileston for St Athan'.

The Great Western Railway opened St. Athan railway station (St Athan Halt until 1943) in 1939 to serve RAF St Athan. Like St Athan Road, this station was not close to the village either.

== Notes ==
Preceding station	Disused railways	Following station
Llanbethery Platform	Taff Vale Railway; Llantrisant-Aberthaw	Aberthaw Low Level
