= St Hilary Platform railway station =

Former railway station in Wales

St Hilary Platform
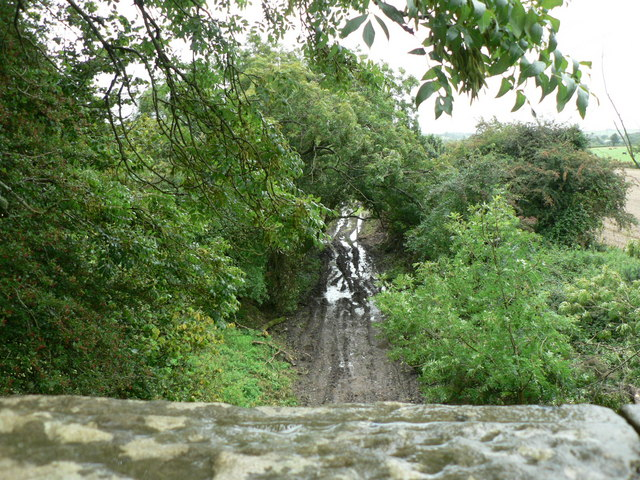
- The trackbed of the former line passing through St Hilary

General information
- Location: St Hilary, Vale of Glamorgan; Wales
- Coordinates: 51.4443°N 3.4262°W
- Platforms: 1

Other information
- Status: Disused

History
- Original company: Taff Vale Railway

Key dates
- 1 May 1905: station opened
- 12 July 1920: station closed
Location

St Hilary Platform was a short-lived station in the Vale of Glamorgan in South Wales.

== History ==
The station was one of four 'platforms' opened on the branch to cater for the new railmotor service. Like the others, St Hilary Platform had a single 40-foot platform, which was without a shelter. Passengers were confined to a fenced enclosure at the rear, which was unlocked by the train conductor when the train arrived. This layout was never altered.

== Location ==
The station was not very conveniently situated with regards to the village which it claimed to serve. It was a considerable distance away, and passengers travelling from the station to the village had to climb a steep hill.

== Closure ==
The station was never a successful undertaking. It closed on 12 July 1920, along with two other 'platforms'. Only Trerhyngyll and Maendy Halt (originally Trerhyngyll and Maendy Platform) survived beyond 1920 with its later 'pagoda'-style shelter still standing in 1959 well after closure to passenger traffic in 1951.

Preceding station	Disused railways	Following station
Cowbridge	Taff Vale Railway; Llantrisant-Aberthaw	St Mary Church Road
