= Barry Island Railway =

Barry Island Railway may refer to:

- Barry Tourist Railway
- Vale of Glamorgan Railway
