= Llanbethery Platform railway station =

Former railway station in Wales

Llanbethery Platform
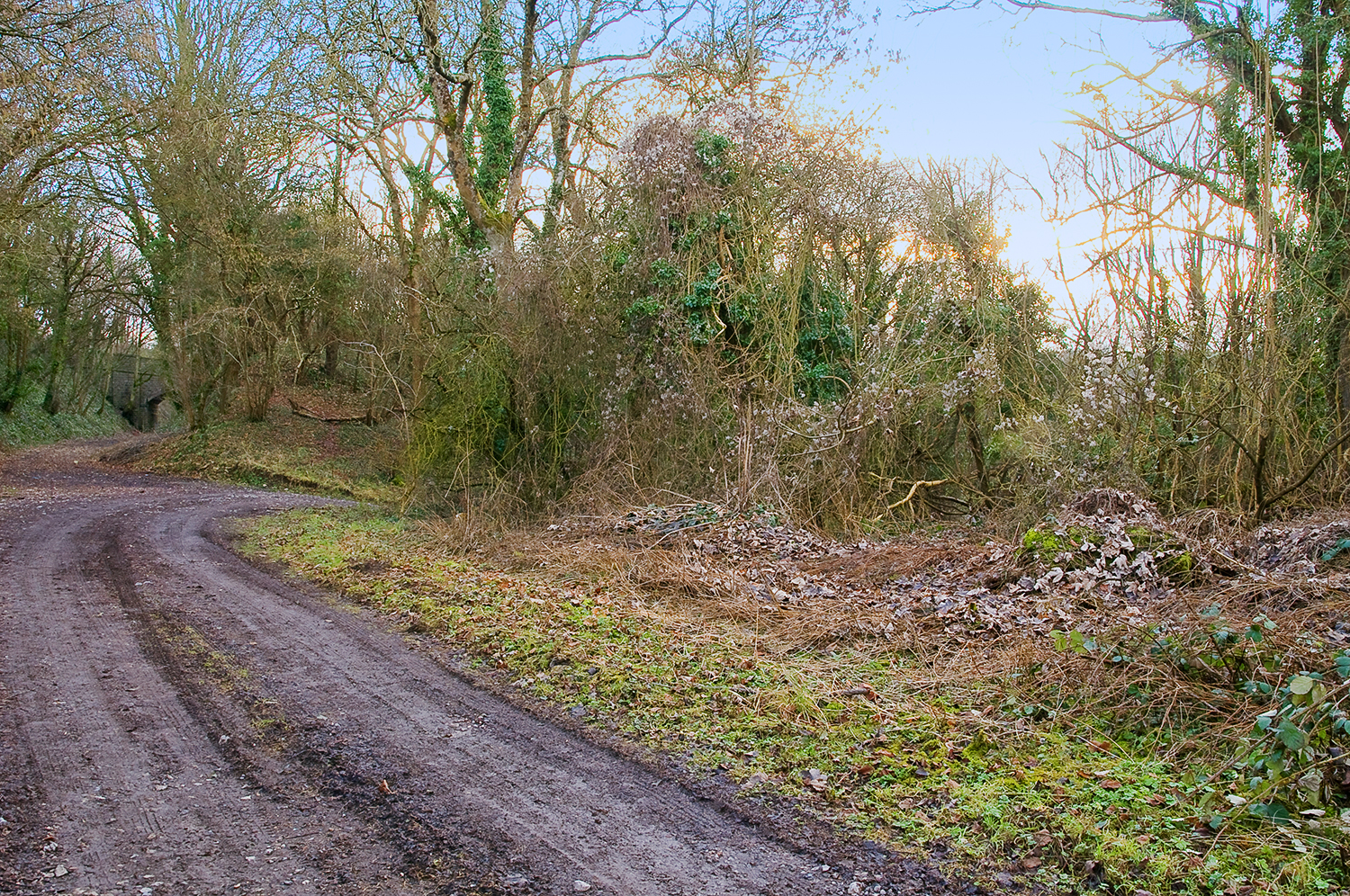
- Site of the former platform in 2011

General information
- Location: Llanbethery, Vale of Glamorgan; Wales
- Coordinates: 51.4164°N 3.3932°W
- Platforms: 1

Other information
- Status: Disused

History
- Original company: Taff Vale Railway

Key dates
- 1 May 1905: Opened
- 12 July 1920: Closed
Location

Llanbethery Platform was a short-lived railway station in the Vale of Glamorgan, South Wales.

== History ==
The station was one of four platforms opened on the line on 1 May 1905. They were designed to cater for the new service run by the Taff Vale Railway using steam railmotors. Llanbethery Platform was of a similar design to the others, consisting of a single forty-foot platform without a shelter. Passengers were confined to a fenced enclosure at the rear of the platform which was unlocked by the train guard. Like many other stations on the line, Llanbethery Platform was not situated near the village, and passengers had to descend a steep hill to reach the station.

== Closure ==
The line between Cowbridge and Aberthaw rarely paid its way. Llanbethery Platform was closed, along with the other "platforms" at Aberthin and St Hilary, on 12 July 1920.

Preceding station	Disused railways	Following station
St Mary Church Road	Taff Vale Railway; Llantrisant-Aberthaw	St Athan Road
