= Gileston railway station =

Former railway station in Wales

Gileston
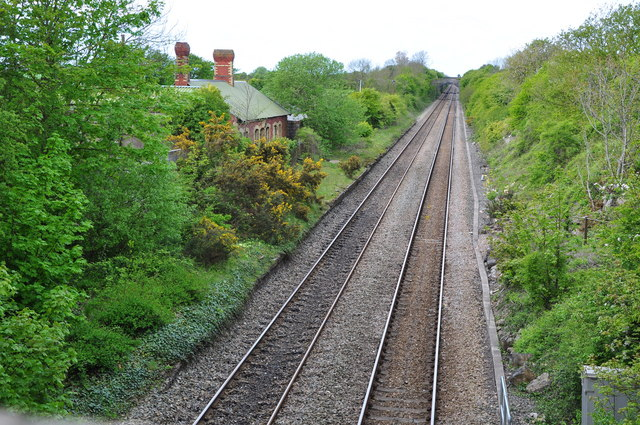
- The former station building in 2009

General information
- Location: Gileston, Vale of Glamorgan; Wales
- Coordinates: 51.3979°N 3.4141°W
- Platforms: 2

Other information
- Status: Disused

History
- Original company: Barry Railway
- Post-grouping: Great Western Railway

Key dates
- 1 December 1897: station opened
- 15 June 1964: station closed
Location

Gileston railway station was a railway station that served the village of Gileston in South Wales.

== Description ==
The station had two platforms with a building on the down platform. The station building was of red brick with yellow quoins. The platforms were linked with a metal footbridge. In later years, a wooden canopy was built on the other platform when the opening of RAF St Athan increased traffic on the line. There was also a small goods yard off the down line.

== Name ==
In the early stages of planning, the station's name was not decided upon, and the names 'Gileston' and 'St Athan' were used interchangeably. The name Gileston was not fixed until 1896. At some point in its later life, the station's nameboard read 'Gileston for St Athan'. The boards displayed this name until closing, but the station but was usually referred to just as Gileston.

== Additional Duties ==
When the southern section of the Llantrisant-Aberthaw line between Cowbridge and Aberthaw closed to passengers, the staff at St Athan Road and Aberthaw Low Level were withdrawn, and their duties were allotted to the staff at Gileston.

== Closure ==
The station closed when passenger services on the line ended in 1964. Although the Vale of Glamorgan Line has since re-opened to passengers, no new station at Gileston has been built.

Preceding station	Disused railways	Following station
Aberthaw High Level	Great Western Railway; Vale of Glamorgan Line	St Athan
