= Penllyn, Vale of Glamorgan =

Penllyn: Welsh: Pen-llin
- Location within the Vale of Glamorgan
- Population: 1,506 (2011)
- OS grid reference: SS973761
- Community: Penllyn
- Principal area: Vale of Glamorgan
- Preserved county: South Glamorgan
- Country: Wales
- Sovereign state: United Kingdom
- Post town: Cowbridge
- Postcode district: CF71
- Dialling code: 01446
- Police: South Wales
- Fire: South Wales
- Ambulance: Welsh
- UK Parliament: Vale of Glamorgan
- Senedd Cymru – Welsh Parliament: Vale of Glamorgan
- List of places UK Wales Vale of Glamorgan 51.475228°N 3.480110°W Map of the community

Penllyn (Welsh: Pen-llin) is a village and community in the Vale of Glamorgan, Wales. It is located north west of the market town of Cowbridge. As a community it contains the settlements of Llansannor, Pentre Meyrick, Trerhyngyll, Ystradowen and Penllyn itself.

Penllyn is home to Penllyn Castle, a 12th-century fortification which, although ruinous, is now adjoined by a castellated mansion originally built in the late 16th century.

The smaller hamlet of Graig Penllyn, about 1.3 miles (2.1 km) north of the main village, is notable for its pub the Barley Mow.

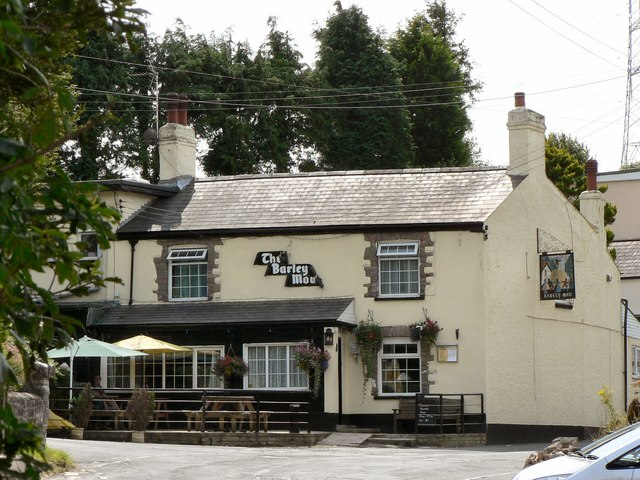
The Barley Mow, Graig Penllyn
