= Llanharry railway station =

Former railway station in Wales

Llanharry

General information
- Location: Llanharry, Vale of Glamorgan; Wales
- Coordinates: 51.5160°N 3.4155°W
- Platforms: 1

Other information
- Status: Disused

History
- Original company: Cowbridge Railway
- Pre-grouping: Taff Vale Railway
- Post-grouping: Great Western Railway

Key dates
- August 1871: opened as Llanharry Platform
- January 1890: rebuilt and renamed Llanharry
- 26 November 1951: closed to passengers
- 1977: closed to goods
Location

Llanharry railway station served the village of Llanharry in the Vale of Glamorgan in South Wales.

== Description ==
The station opened in August 1871. It was located just south of the Llanharry Road bridge and was initially a single platform without any form of shelter. It was located about three-quarters of a mile from the village which it served. The line was opened by the Cowbridge Railway and taken over by the Taff Vale Railway in 1889, and Llanharry was updated. The station was re-sited on the other side of the line and had a station building added. This was built of yellow bricks with red quoins, and was similar to those built elsewhere on the line. Shortly after the new station was built, the old one was removed.

== Closure ==
The station closed to passengers in 1951. In 1965, the track from Llanharry onward was dismantled. The line from Pontyclun to Llanharry remained in use for another ten years to service the Llanharry Iron Ore Mine. The last iron ore train ran on 25 July 1975. The line closed officially in 1977 and was lifted soon after.

Preceding station	Disused railways	Following station
Llantrisant	Taff Vale Railway; Llantrisant-Aberthaw	Ystradowen
