= Llandow Halt railway station =

Former railway station in Wales

Llandow Halt

General information
- Location: Llandow, Vale of Glamorgan; Wales
- Coordinates: 51.4502°N 3.5259°W
- Platforms: 2

Other information
- Status: Disused

History
- Original company: Barry Railway

Key dates
- 1 May 1915: opened
- 15 June 1964: closed
Location

Llandow Halt railway station served the village of Llandow in South Wales.

== History ==
When the Vale of Glamorgan Railway opened in 1897, four of its five original stations served the principal settlements along the route. The fifth station, Southerndown Road acted as a feeder station for several smaller villages nearby. However, this arrangement was not entirely satisfactory, as there was a long stretch of line between this station and Llantwit Major which was left unserved by trains. To some extent, this did not matter, as most settlements lay well to the south of the railway. The one exception was Llandow, which was located very near to the line but had very inadequate road access to the two nearest stations. As a result, the Llandow Parish Council requested that the railway company erect a halt. The first request was made in 1898, with another in 1901, but these were both refused. In 1905, with the introduction of steam railmotor services on the line, the Barry Railway Company agreed to erect halts at Llandow and Fontigary, but these were not built. A further request in 1908 was turned down. It was not until 1915 that the company accepted a fourth application and approved the building of Llandow Halt, which received provisional sanction from the Board of Trade on 20 April 1915 and opened on 1 May. It had cost £250 to build.

== Description ==
Llandow Halt was a very basic affair, consisting of two wooden platforms, each 130 feet in length. Each platform had an open-fronted wooden shelter. The crossing was at ground level and was equipped with an electric bell for safety. The bell was operated by treadles placed on both lines, 250 feet away from the crossing. Additional signals were added to the existing signal box. The inspection of the new facilities, which did not occur until 15 October 1915, entirely satisfied with these arrangements.

== Closure ==
The station closed in 1964 when passenger services along the line were withdrawn.

Preceding station	Disused railways	Following station
Llandow (Wick Road) Halt; Line open; station closed	Great Western Railway; Vale of Glamorgan Line	Southerndown Road; Line open, station closed
