= Murders of Harry and Megan Tooze =

Unsolved murder case in Wales

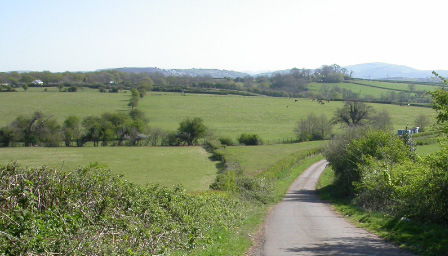
- The rural area north of Llanharry. The Toozes' farm (where they were shot dead) can be seen in the distance in the top-left corner of the image. The killer would have travelled there using this road or on the other roads nearby.

- Murders of Harry and Megan Tooze (Wales)
- Date: 26 July 1993
- Time: 13:30
- Location: Ty ar y Waun Farm in Llanharry, Rhondda Cynon Taf, Wales, UK; 51.52381800°N 3.42523700°W
- Cause: Shot with a shotgun
- Deaths: 2

The murders of Harry and Megan Tooze, also known as the Llanharry murders, were the high-profile killings of a couple at their remote Tŷ ar y Waun farm near Llanharry, Rhondda Cynon Taf, Wales, United Kingdom, on 26 July 1993. The couple were shot dead at point blank range with a shotgun in an execution-style killing, and their killer attempted to hide their bodies in the cowshed of the farm. Their best china was found mysteriously laid out on the table in the farmhouse as if the couple were expecting a guest, and their lunch was found cooked but not eaten on the stove. It was described by the lead detective in charge of the case as the "most baffling" case he had investigated.

Jonathan Jones, the boyfriend of the Toozes' daughter, was initially convicted of their murders in 1995. His fingerprint had been found on one of the teacups. It was alleged that Jones had killed the victims for their £150,000 life insurance payment as he was in financial difficulty.

Jones' conviction was subsequently quashed a year later. The case remains one of Wales' most notorious unsolved murders.

== Background ==
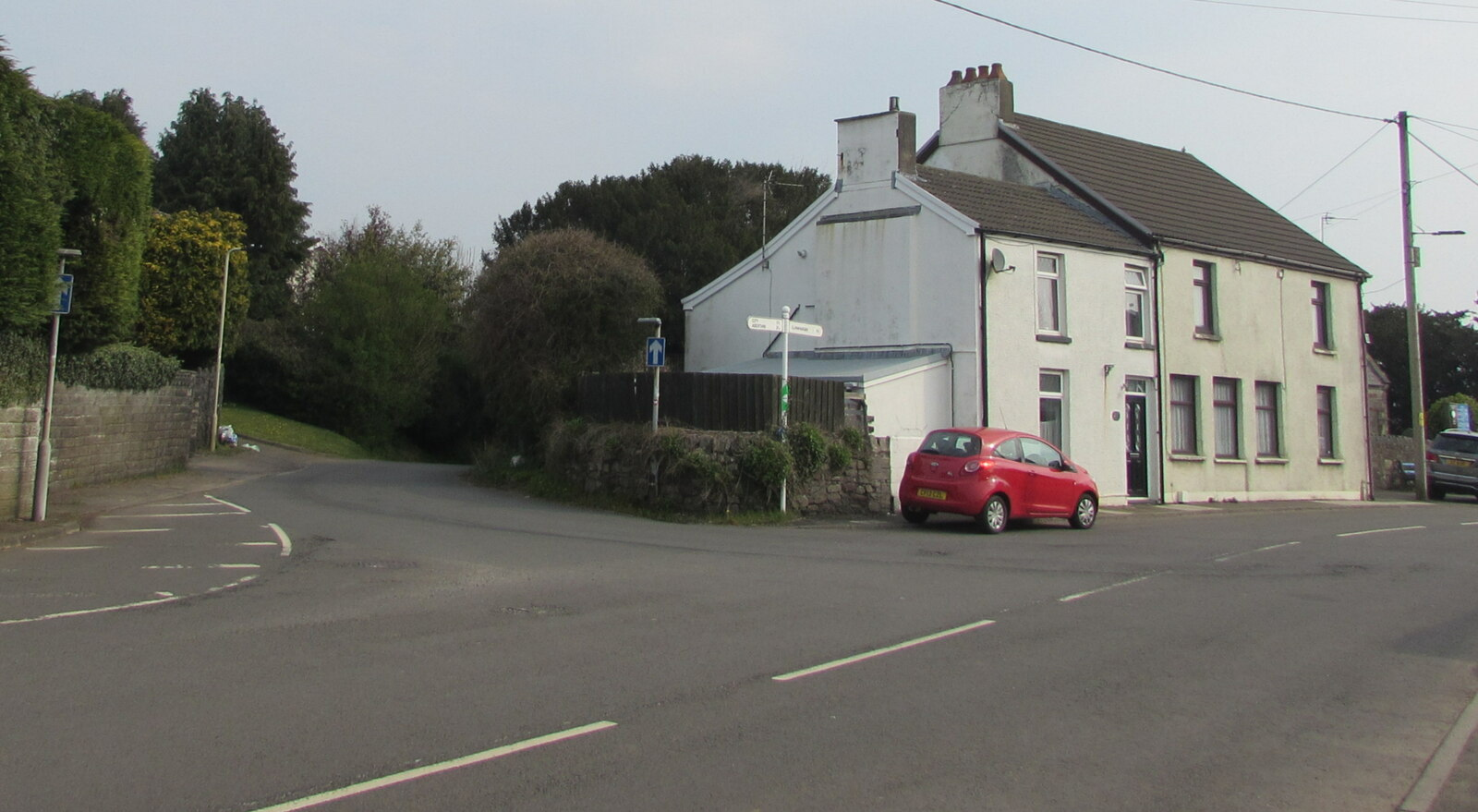
The turning in Llanharry for the road that leads to the Tooze farm

Harry and Megan Tooze were an elderly couple who lived together on a remote farm just north of Llanharry in South Wales. Harry was aged 65 at the time of the murders, while Megan was aged 67. Harry was well known in the community through his market garden business, although he had retired seven years previously when the couple's only daughter, Cheryl Tooze, had also moved away. Harry still spent time growing cabbages at his farm, but the pair were said to live an "uneventful" life. Around a year before the murders, in 1992, Harry's shotgun, which he used to shoot rabbits that were attempting to eat his cabbages, was mysteriously stolen from the farm.

== Murders ==
On the morning of Monday 26 July 1993, the Toozes left the farm to collect their pensions in Llanharry. While shopping at the local Tesco supermarket Harry bumped into one of his sisters, who did not notice anything unusual about her brother. A neighbour reported seeing the couple arriving back at the farm by around 11:00.

At around 13:30, two shots were heard by neighbours thirty seconds apart. They did not consider this unusual, as they knew Harry often shot rabbits. Cheryl rang the house approximately ninety minutes later but received no answer. That evening, when her nightly phone call again went unanswered, Cheryl alerted her parents' neighbours, who in turn summoned the South Wales Police.

Responding officers discovered Harry and Megan's bodies in a cowshed on the farm, buried under hay. They had both been shot with a shotgun at point blank range in an execution-style killing. Inside the farmhouse, the table had been set for lunch with the couple's best china; a teacup was also set on the table, which police learned was only ever used when an important visitor was present. The crockery that had been set out was never used for everyday use. The lunch was found cooked on the stove but not eaten. There were no signs of robbery.

The nature of the crime scene made police believe that the Toozes may have known their killer. They considered that they may have stopped by unannounced, which would explain why the stove had been turned off and tea prepared. The indications were that the couple had not themselves drunk from the teacup, with Megan's own favourite mug nearby and Harry's mug also on the table, pointing to there being a visitor at the farm that lunchtime. A white shirt of Harry's was found laid out on the bed, further indicating that he was expecting someone or going out for a social engagement.

== Initial investigation ==
"The killing bears all the hallmarks of an execution. It was carefully planned. The killer knew his victims and they knew him. He knew their daily habits, their property and its layout"

— The lead detective on the case, commenting on the circumstances

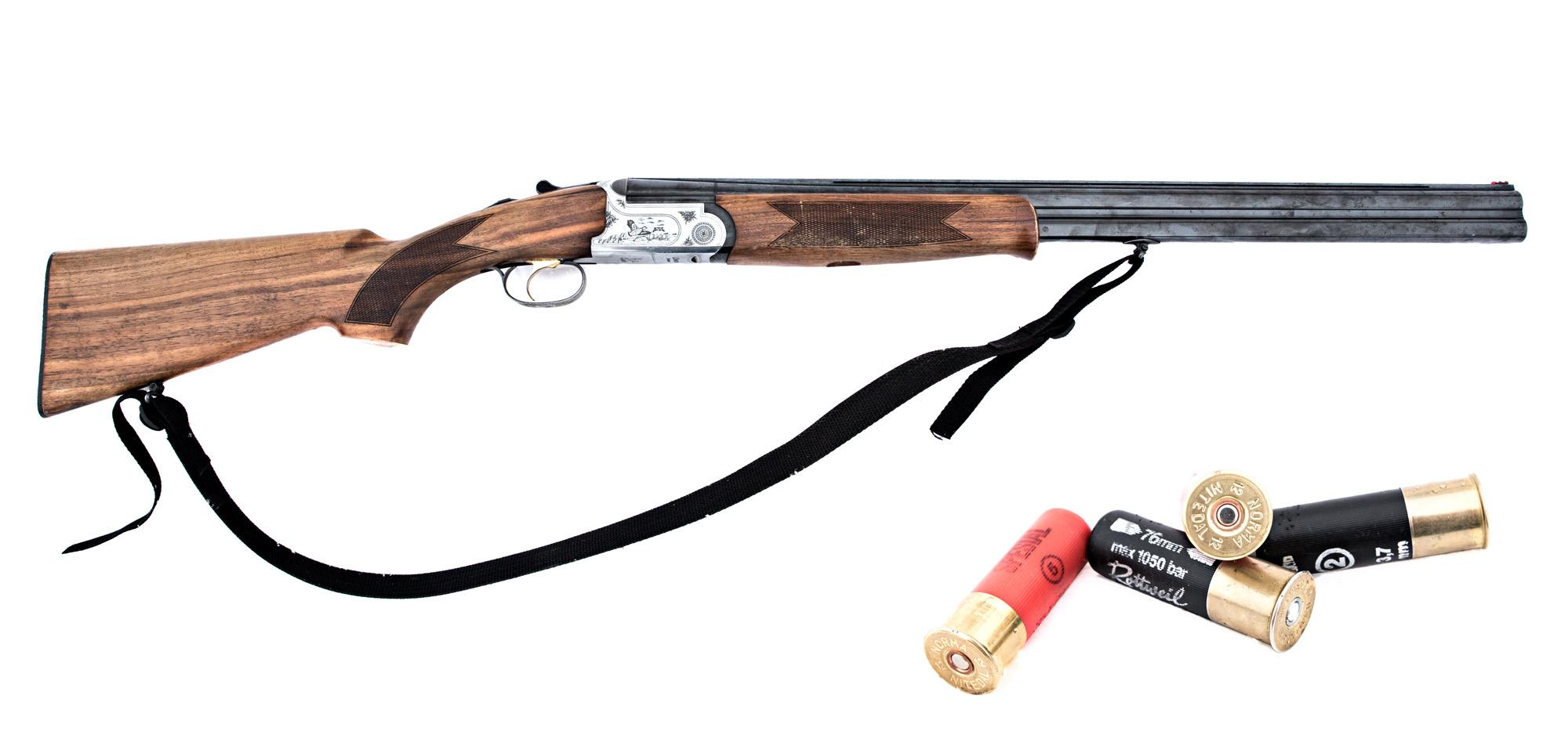
A 12-bore shotgun, the kind which would have been used in the murder

Murder-suicide was quickly ruled out when drag marks believed to have been made from a body were found going from near the farmhouse to the cowshed. A forensic and ballistics analysis determined Harry had been shot just inside the door of the cowshed, after which he was placed in a trough and covered with hay and tarpaulin sheets in order to conceal the body. Megan had been shot at the other side of the farmhouse, possibly near the corner of the kitchen, and it was theorised she may have been trying to escape. Her body had then also been placed in the cowshed and covered with a carpet. Both victims had each been shot once in the back of the head from 60–90 cm (2–3 ft) away.

The entrance to the cowshed was out of view of neighbours. A number of heavy tools kept in the doorway would have had to have been moved to enter, and it appeared they had later been moved back to their original position. It was believed that the shots used were number 7 shot, but no cartridges were located. Number 7 was not the type of shot Harry had ever used. No evidence would be found that suggested the shotgun stolen from Harry a year before had been the one used in the murders.

At first it was thought that the shooting might have been a professional hit, but ballistics experts reckoned that determination may have been all which was needed to carry out the murders successfully. Forensic evidence in the cowshed indicated the killer would likely have been splattered with blood and body tissue, but no blood was found anywhere else on the farm. Because Harry's body showed evident hypostasis on the side he was not found lying on, it was concluded he had been moved three to four hours after he had died. Megan's body showed hypostasis in a much smaller amount, possibly suggesting that she may have been killed some time after Harry.

The murder weapon was not located, and the investigative team initially focused on the possibility that the Toozes had disturbed an intruder. However, there was no evidence of intrusion and nothing had been stolen, with money and valuable jewellery left in the house untouched. Harry himself had £75 on him which had also been left untouched.

On 9 September 1993, two months after the murders, a reconstruction and appeal was shown on the BBC's Crimewatch, where it was asked that the unknown visitor to the farmhouse come forward to eliminate themselves. It was said that very few people had been found to have ever visited the Toozes at the farmhouse. An appeal was also made for any passersby to come forward, with the key M4 motorway passing through Llanharry. Members of the public who knew what had happened to Harry's previously stolen shotgun were also asked to come forward. The lead detective on the case revealed that, despite extensive enquiries, no motive for the killings had been found, and said the case was the "most baffling" he had investigated.

== Jonathan Jones emerges as a suspect ==
Llanharry (Rhondda Cynon Taf)

The route of the M4 motorway.

At the time of the murders, Cheryl lived with her boyfriend Jonathan Jones in Orpington, Kent, although they often visited the Toozes' farm in Llanharry. Megan was religious and both she and Harry had strong values, so when Cheryl had moved in with Jones out of wedlock it was kept a secret from her parents. The Toozes were devastated when Cheryl moved away and eventually found out about her living arrangements with Jones, but did not tell their friends.

Jones, also from Wales, had been trying to make it as a recruitment consultant, but his attempts were failing and he had instead decided that he would start his own marketing business, even though he only had £100 in his bank account. At the time of the murders, the couple were falling behind on their house repayments and were about to lose their flat, although Jones kept this from Cheryl. These financial difficulties raised the suspicions of the police. Harry and Megan had a £150,000 life insurance policy, which investigators believed gave Jones a motive for the murders. There was evidence that, a few days before the murders, the Toozes had visited a solicitor about a contested will. Jones knew that Cheryl was the sole beneficiary of her parents' estate.

Police were informed by numerous witnesses about a man seen walking along a road near the Tooze farm in late June, wearing a beige trench coat and dark sunglasses. He was described as wearing a hold-all bag, and hid his face from passing motorists. Later during the investigation, one of these witnesses phoned police and reported that she recognised Jones as the man she had seen. Jones subsequently confirmed that he had been in the area, claiming he was with Harry baling hay after he had hitchhiked to Pontypridd. Jones also possessed a trench coat of the same description and many friends testified that they had seen him wearing it, but he and Cheryl claimed that he did not own it. Police began to believe that Jones had stolen Harry's shotgun prior to the murders.

Police discovered that Jones's fingerprint was on the teacup found at the farmhouse, despite him and Cheryl denying that he had ever used it. This suggested that Jones was the mysterious visitor who appeared at the Tooze farm on the day of the murders, especially since he was a close associate of the Toozes and a surprise visit might have necessitated their use of the good china. Apart from Harry and Megan's own fingerprints, only Jones' fingerprint was found on the items at the scene.

Jones' alibi for the day of the murders was that he had taken that Monday off to look for new office premises for his marketing business in Orpington, meeting with estate agents. However, after making enquiries around Orpington, police found no witnesses who could substantiate this alibi and found no estate agents who said they had seen or spoken to him that day. It was discovered that the return trip from Orpington to Llanharry and back would have taken a maximum of seven hours by car or train, giving Jones enough time to commit the murders that day.

Jones claimed to have had a conversation with a lift engineer at his flat at around 13:30 on the day of the murders, but the lift engineer and two others working that day recalled no such conversation and reported being out for lunch at that time. Further undermining the alibi was that Jones had failed to return a rented videotape that was due back at a shop along the route he claimed to have walked that day, and because the exact time frame the experts suggested the murders took place (between 13:30 and 15:00) were the exact times Jones stated he was at home. Cheryl would later admit to police that Jones wasn't home when she returned from work that evening, and that she could not tell whether he had been in the flat that day or not. Jones subsequently admitted that he had lied and that he had not made any inquiries with estate agents that day.

When Cheryl had become concerned about her parents not answering the phone that evening, she asked Jonathan to drive the 320 km (200 mi) to Llanharry to check up on them, purportedly unable to go herself as she had to work the following morning. He set off between 22:00 and 23:00, and at 01:00 he called Cheryl to say that he was still 106 km (66 mi) short of the farm at Leigh Delamere services on the M4. Jones did not arrive until 03:00, claiming that the weather had slowed him down, at which time he was told by officers that the bodies had been found. Police reported that he showed a "strange reaction" when informed of the murders. Police became suspicious at the length of Jones' journey, which was far longer than it should have taken. They believed that Jones had disposed of clothing and the murder weapon during the drive.

After questioning both Jonathan and Cheryl, police felt that both were withholding and/or fabricating information and said that Cheryl had been dodging almost every question asked of her. The decision was made to arrest and charge Jonathan two months after the murder.

== Trial ==
Police charged Jones with the murders and he was brought to trial in 1995. The police theory was that he had caught the train from Orpington to Pontypridd that morning and surprised Harry and Megan while they were making their lunch, leading them to get out the good china and make tea, possibly thinking he was there to ask them for permission to marry their daughter. After the murders he would have returned on the train and arrived back at the flat at 19:30 as he said he had.

Jones was depicted as a motivated and greedy son-in-law, intent on killing them for the will money which would secure his and Cheryl's future. It was the general consensus at the time that the jury could never find Jones guilty on the evidence presented, but the jury were largely convinced and found him guilty of the murders after only two hours of deliberations.

== Appeal ==
Cheryl Tooze said she was dismayed by the verdict and offered a £25,000 reward for information from the public that would support her boyfriend's alibi and prove him innocent. This money had come from the £150,000 she had inherited from the murder of her parents. Her relations with her family members broke down as they were angry at her support for Jonathan. Cheryl's aunt (Megan Tooze's sister) commented: "Why can't she let her parents rest in peace? I sat through every day of the trial and I'm happy that Jonathan is where he should be. Cheryl has been totally blinded by the man." Jury members spoke out against claims that they had got it wrong, with one saying: "They are making us out to be imbeciles. We are all educated people. One of the ladies on the jury was a school teacher. I am sorry but I think he is guilty."

Jones decided to appeal on a number of grounds, including technical claims that the judge had misdirected the jury in his summing up. His team tried to find evidence to support his claim that he had spoken to lift engineers in the flat that day, although these individuals still maintained that he had not. To this day no-one has ever come forward to confirm Jones' alibi and there remains no proof of what he was doing that day. The Court of Appeal allowed the appeal on the legal grounds Jones's team presented, and although they considered ordering a re-trial they decided that this would be "inappropriate". Jones was freed and he and Cheryl embraced in a long kiss for the media outside of court, with Cheryl proudly declaring that the release of her boyfriend for the murder of her parents was "a victory for love and truth". After the appeal, Cheryl and Jones married and the couple raised a son together. Jones did not receive compensation for his imprisonment as there was no evidence that showed he was innocent.

== Subsequent investigations ==
In 2000, with the murders legally unsolved, two reviews of the case were carried out, although the results of these have never been made public so as to not influence any potential future trial or re-trial. On the 10th anniversary of the murders in 2003 the police revealed that they had received an anonymous letter in November 2002, the contents of which have never been published. An appeal was made for the letter writer to come forward and police said they believed the letter was genuine. They revealed that they thought that the letter had come from someone in the area, but did not know whether it was from a man or a woman. The lead detective on the case Trefor Evans said that he did not think it had been sent by the killer. That year, after a new search, police also found shotgun cartridges in a flooded iron ore mine shaft on nearby land. They were in a black hold-all bag with red stitching, a zip and 'Team Daiwa' written in gold lettering. DCI Evans revealed that the original investigation had been given an anonymous tip-off that items had been dumped down a nearby mine shaft, but they had been unable to search then as they did not have permission. Barrels of a shotgun were also found in a quarry only 800 m (1/2 mi) from the farm. They were from a double-barrelled 12-bore gun, the same which had been used in the murders. Experts concluded that they had been dismantled from a gun by someone with firearms expertise. The investigation into the murders was re-opened and witness accounts of cars seen in the area at the time of the murders were also examined. Forensic tests were conducted on the discovered items. In 2006 new witnesses came forward about the cars seen, but in 2008 South Wales Police said that all lines of inquiry had been exhausted and the investigation was reduced. It was also reported at this point that detectives no longer believed the gun-related items found in the last few years were related to the crime.

On 26 July 2023, the 30th anniversary of the murders, South Wales Police launched a forensic review of the case.

On 17 December 2025, South Wales Police announced that they had arrested an 86-year-old man in relation to the murders and that he had subsequently been released on bail. On 2 October 2026, South Wales Police announced that the man is no longer under investigation.

=== John Cooper investigated ===
After serial killer burglar John Cooper's convictions in 2011 for the double shotgun murders of couples in Pembrokeshire in the 1980s, it was revealed that detectives were investigating whether there was any "connectivity" between Cooper and the Tooze murders. Some similarities with Cooper's known murders were noted, including the fact that both victims were shot at close range and attempts were made to hide their bodies. Cooper always used a shotgun in his known crimes. It was also observed that there are very few double shotgun murders nationally, and that Cooper was already known to have committed two double shotgun murders. In 2011, the year Cooper was convicted, the Tooze case was re-examined by police, but no evidence was found to conclusively link him to the case. Harry and Megan would not have known Cooper, and so the theory would not explain why the best china was laid out as if a guest had arrived. Cooper also stole from his victims, and nothing was found stolen from the farm. Police also found that Cooper was not familiar with the Llanharry area, although he once attended a hospital appointment in Bridgend that year. Cooper's modus operandi was to target areas he knew well, with all his crimes being committed in the general area he lived in, in Pembrokeshire, and also always shot his victims face-on, unlike in the Tooze murders. Jones' lawyer insisted that Cooper was a better suspect than Jones.

== Aftermath ==
The Tooze murders remain some of Wales' most notorious unsolved murders. The killing was particularly shocking to locals in the area, as it was a community that had only seen one reported break-in over the preceding 60 years. The murder promoted fears at the time that a serial killer was at large.

In 1999, Jones met up with Eddie Browning, the man convicted and then controversially freed of the murder of Marie Wilks in 1988.

In 2009, the murders were investigated in a chapter of Vanessa Howard's book Britain's Ten Most Wanted: The Truth Behind The Most Shocking Unsolved Murders.

In early 2021 the Tooze murders returned to the news after the airing of The Pembrokeshire Murders series on ITV, which dramatised the investigation that led to serial killer John Cooper finally being apprehended. It was noted in several news outlets that he had once been linked to the Tooze murders.

In April 2021, the murders were the subject of a Crime+ Investigation podcast, as part of their podcast series spin-off from their documentary series Murdertown. The episode was titled The Llanharry Murders: South Wales.

== See also ==
- William Herbert Wallace – English man who had his murder conviction quashed when it was determined there was no evidence to support it.
- Murder of Helen Gorrie – another UK case from 1992 which led to a man being quickly released on appeal in controversial circumstances
