= Trerhyngyll =

Coordinates: 51.4816°N 3.4337°W

- Location within the Vale of Glamorgan
- OS grid reference: ST005783
- Principal area: Vale of Glamorgan
- Preserved county: South Glamorgan
- Country: Wales
- Sovereign state: United Kingdom
- Post town: Cowbridge
- Postcode district: CF7
- Police: South Wales
- Fire: South Wales
- Ambulance: Welsh
- UK Parliament: Vale of Glamorgan
- Senedd Cymru – Welsh Parliament: Vale of Glamorgan

Trerhyngyll is a small village in the Vale of Glamorgan, about 2 miles (3.2 km) north of Cowbridge and 1 mile (1.6 km) south of Ystradowen, near Maendy, off the A4222 road. Trerhyngyll and Maendy Halt railway station operated here from 1905 to 1951, though the line was closed to passengers as early as 1930 between Cowbridge and Aberthaw. In 1986 it was described as a "typical vale village with between 50–60 houses, most of which are 10–50 years old though 8 are over 200 years old." Trerhyngyll typically houses commuters who work in Cowbridge or Cardiff.
