= Trerhyngyll and Maendy Halt railway station =

Former railway station in Wales

Trerhyngyll and Maendy Halt

General information
- Location: Trerhyngyll, Vale of Glamorgan; Wales
- Coordinates: 51.4792°N 3.4295°W
- Grid reference: ST008765
- Platforms: 1

Other information
- Status: Disused

History
- Original company: Taff Vale Railway

Key dates
- 1887: request for station denied
- 1 May 1905: opened as Trerhyngyll and Maendy Platform
- 1922: renamed Trerhyngyll and Maendy Halt
- 24 November 1951: closed
Location

Trerhyngyll and Maendy Halt railway station was a railway halt in the Vale of Glamorgan.

== History ==
In spite of requests from residents, the Taff Vale Railway had refused to provide a station in the area in 1887 because the company considered such an undertaking to be financially undesirable. However, when a railmotor service was introduced on the line in the 1900s, four new platforms were planned, and one of these was to serve Trerhyngyll and Maendy, together with Prisk and Welsh St Donats. It opened on 1 May 1905, together with the three others. Uniquely among them, it was conveniently located to the villages it served. The original facilities were very basic. It was a single forty-foot platform without a shelter, passengers being confined to a fenced enclosure at the rear, which would be opened by the guard. Despite the fact that passenger numbers were adequate, the Taff Vale Railway rejected a request in 1910 for the spartan facilities to be improved. Trerhyngyll and Maendy was the only one of the four platforms to survive being closed in 1920. By this time, the platform had been lengthened to allow it to accommodate trains of two coaches. When the Taff Vale Railway was absorbed by the Great Western Railway in 1922, the suffix 'Platform' was replaced with 'Halt'. The new owners also added a corrugated iron waiting shelter.

== Closure ==
The station closed when the passenger service ended in 1951.

Preceding station	Disused railways	Following station
Ystradowen	Taff Vale Railway; Llantrisant-Aberthaw	Aberthin Platform
