= Aberthaw Low Level railway station =

Disused railway station in Aberthaw, Wales

Coordinates: 51.38898°N 3.38888°W

Aberthaw Low Level
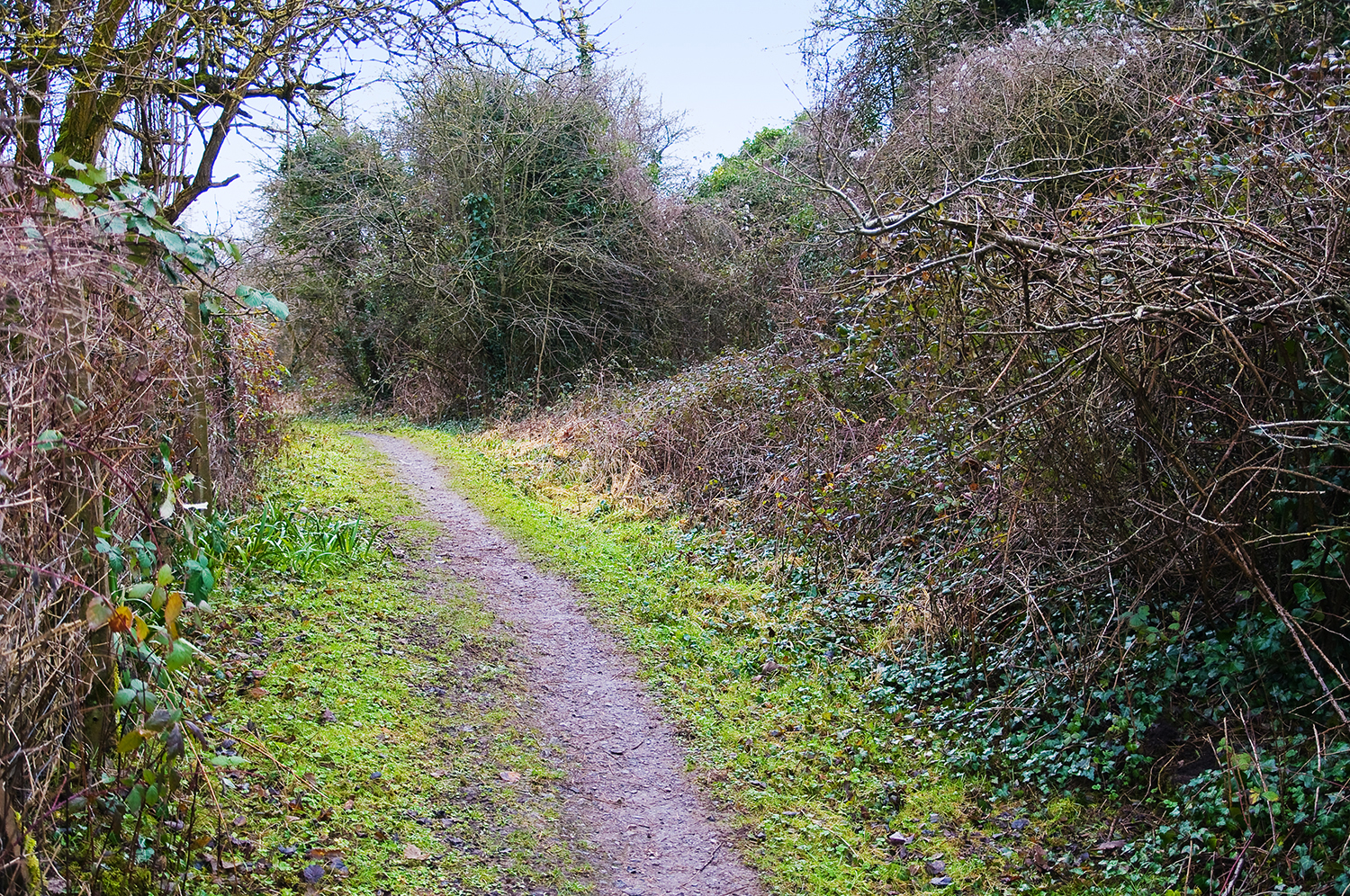
- Former site of the station

General information
- Location: Aberthaw, Vale of Glamorgan; Wales
- Platforms: 1

Other information
- Status: Disused

History
- Original company: Taff Vale Railway
- Pre-grouping: Taff Vale Railway
- Post-grouping: Great Western Railway

Key dates
- 1 October 1892: Station opens as Aberthaw (TV)
- 1 July 1924: Station renamed Aberthaw Low Level
- 4 May 1926: Station closed
- 11 July 1927: Station reopens
- 5 May 1930: Station closed
Location

Aberthaw Low Level railway station was the Taff Vale Railway station which served East Aberthaw, located near the north shore of the Bristol Channel in the Welsh county of Glamorgan.

== History ==
Opened by the Taff Vale Railway on 1 October 1892, it became part of the Great Western Railway during the Grouping of 1923. Saturday 3 May 1930 saw the last passenger train from Llantrisant to Aberthaw Low level station but the low level goods facility at Aberthaw closed on 1 November 1932 and track lifting was undertaken from June 1934 from Beaupre, south of Cowbridge and from Cowbridge in 1946.

== The site today ==
The site is now a wooded area next to the former site of the High Level station but some modern private dwellings and a small reservoir are now established near the site of the low level station, the seaward side being officially named 'Pleasant Harbour'. Passenger trains pass at the higher level of the Vale of Glamorgan line and also coal trains for Aberthaw Power Station and some cement works traffic or diverted South Wales main line services pass through. The station at Aberthaw (High Level) was closed in June 1964, never to be reopened and private dwellings are situated on the former UP platform and Aberthaw signal box (previously named Aberthaw East) stands on the former DOWN platform, devoid of internals and is a 'listed' structure now.

Preceding station	Disused railways	Following station
St Athan Road	Taff Vale Railway; Llantrisant-Aberthaw	Terminus
