= Pentre Meyrick =

Village in the Vale of Glamorgam, Wales

Coordinates: 51.472526°N 3.4889925°W

Pentre Meyrick: Welsh: Pentremeurig
- Village
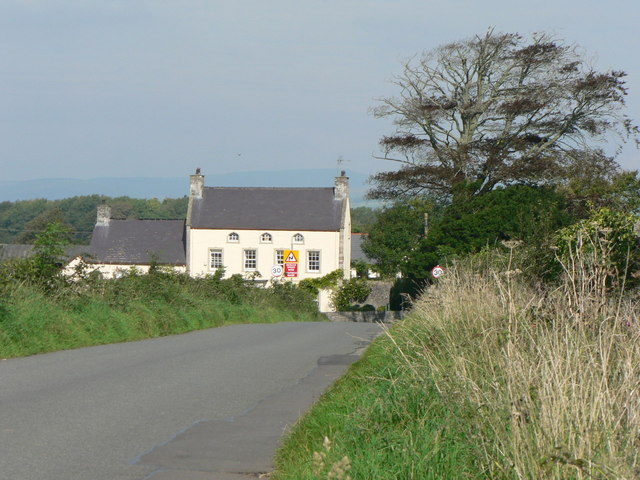
- Pentre Meyrick seen from the A48

- Location within the Vale of Glamorgan
- OS grid reference: SS 9667 7589
  - Cardiff: 17.7 mi (28.5 km)
- Community: Penllyn
- Principal area: Vale of Glamorgan
- Preserved county: South Glamorgan
- Country: Wales
- Sovereign state: United Kingdom
- Post town: Cowbridge
- Postcode district: CF71
- Dialling code: 01446
- Police: South Wales
- Fire: South Wales
- Ambulance: Welsh
- UK Parliament: Vale of Glamorgan
- Senedd Cymru – Welsh Parliament: Vale of Glamorgan

Pentre Meyrick (often spelt as Pentremeyrick (Welsh: Pentremeurig)) is a small village in the community of Penllyn, in the Vale of Glamorgan, Wales. It is located north-west of the nearby market town of Cowbridge. The village is considered to be the "villa" closest to Cowbridge. The village lies at the intersection between the A48 and B4268.

== Etymology ==
The village's name Pentre Meyrick originates from the Welsh word pentre, meaning a 'village' or 'homestead', and the personal name Meyrick, an anglicisation of the Welsh name Meurig. This means the name roughly translates to 'The homestead (or village) of Meurig'. The name possibly refers to Meurig ap Tewdrig, the historical king of the lands on which Pentre Meyrick lies.
