= Southerndown Road railway station =

Former railway station in Wales

Southerndown Road

General information
- Location: Southerndown, Vale of Glamorgan; Wales
- Coordinates: 51.4611°N 3.5606°W
- Platforms: 2

Other information
- Status: Disused

History
- Original company: Barry Railway

Key dates
- 1 December 1897: opened
- 23 October 1961: closed
Location

Southerndown Road railway station was a railway station in South Wales. It opened in 1897 and closed in 1961. Between 1898 and 1910, it was the proposed junction for the planned Vale of Glamorgan Light Railway.

== Design ==
The station was one of the five original stations opened in 1897. It had two platforms with brick station buildings on the 'down' platform and the signal box centrally placed on the up platform. There were platform loops on both sides, so four lines of rails ran through the station (the loops were later removed) and the goods yard on the 'down' side was similar to the others on the line, though had an additional crossover halfway along the loop siding. In 1913, a corrugated iron goods shed was built on the 'down' platform.

== Locale ==
Unlike the four other large stations, Southerndown Road was not located in a settlement and had almost no nearby habitation at all. It acted as a feeder station for a very wide rural area. It had been built with hopes of a branch line to Southerndown itself.

== Vale of Glamorgan Light Railway ==
From the mid-nineteenth century onward, Southerndown had been a popular holiday destination and had the possibility of becoming a resort town. However, this development was limited by the absence of railway connection. From at least 1890, a horse brake service had operated between Bridgend railway station and Southerndown, but as this was operated by the Great Western Railway, it was of no use to the Barry Railway which was by then running the Vale of Glamorgan line. The passing of the Light Railways Act 1896 (59 & 60 Vict. c. 48) offered the chance of building lines economically and over the next decade or so, various schemes were proposed for the light railway, but none came to fruition.

First Scheme In September 1897, the support of the Barry Railway was promised to the Vale of Glamorgan Company. The proposed line would be two miles and three quarters long with a ruling gradient of 1 in 50. The estimated cost was £13,500. The surveys were completed and notices prepared for submission to the Light Railway Commissioners, but the scheme went no further owing to the opposition of the principal landowner on the route. Subsequently, an alternative route was prepared.

Second Scheme The alternative route prepared by the engineer was five miles long. It was to leave the main line at Ewenny and follow the River Ogmore to Ogmore-by-Sea before proceeding along the coast to Southerndown. The estimated costs were £20,000 with an additional £3000 needed for the curve towards Barry. The Barry Railway balked at these costs and the plans were abandoned. In 1899, a horse brake service was introduced to connect Southerndown Road with the village.

Third Scheme The need for a better connection still lingered and led the Barry company to consider the possibility of a motor bus service, but this was considered financially undesirable. In 1904, they subsequently returned to the idea of a light railway and three possible routes were prepared. The first was more or less identical to the first scheme of 1897 and would've cost £19,000. Another following the opposite side of the valley from Southerndown Road station would cost £2000 less. The third route left the line at Ewenny and followed the dry valley towards St Brides Major. The route would require the erection of platforms at Ewenny and had a maximum gradient of 1 in 27. Th estimated cost were £21,000. None of these plans were proceeded with.

Fourth Scheme Later in 1904, the Barry Directors instructed their engineer to investigate the possibility of a tramway between Bridgend and Southerndown. This proposal would cost £30,000 and would probably have attracted passengers from the Great Western line rather than via Barry. On 30 June 1904, the Barry company decided to postpone discussion on the matter until the local authorities were prepared to allow level crossings on the route. Despite this, plans never were resumed and dried up after this point. The horse brake continued to operate until 1915 when motor buses were introduced to the area. In retrospect, it is unlikely that a light railway could have thrived for long in such an environment.

== Later years and closure ==
Southerndown Road was the only station which did not profit from the influx of traffic to and from the new RAF bases built in the 1930s. The station closed entirely in 1961. It was the only one on the line to do so before the passenger service was withdrawn in 1964.

Preceding station	Historical railways	Following station
Llandow Halt; Line open; station closed	Barry Railway; Vale of Glamorgan Railway	Bridgend; Line and station open
