= Aberthin Platform railway station =

Disused railway station in Aberthin, Wales

Coordinates: 51.47001°N 3.43430°W

Aberthin Platform
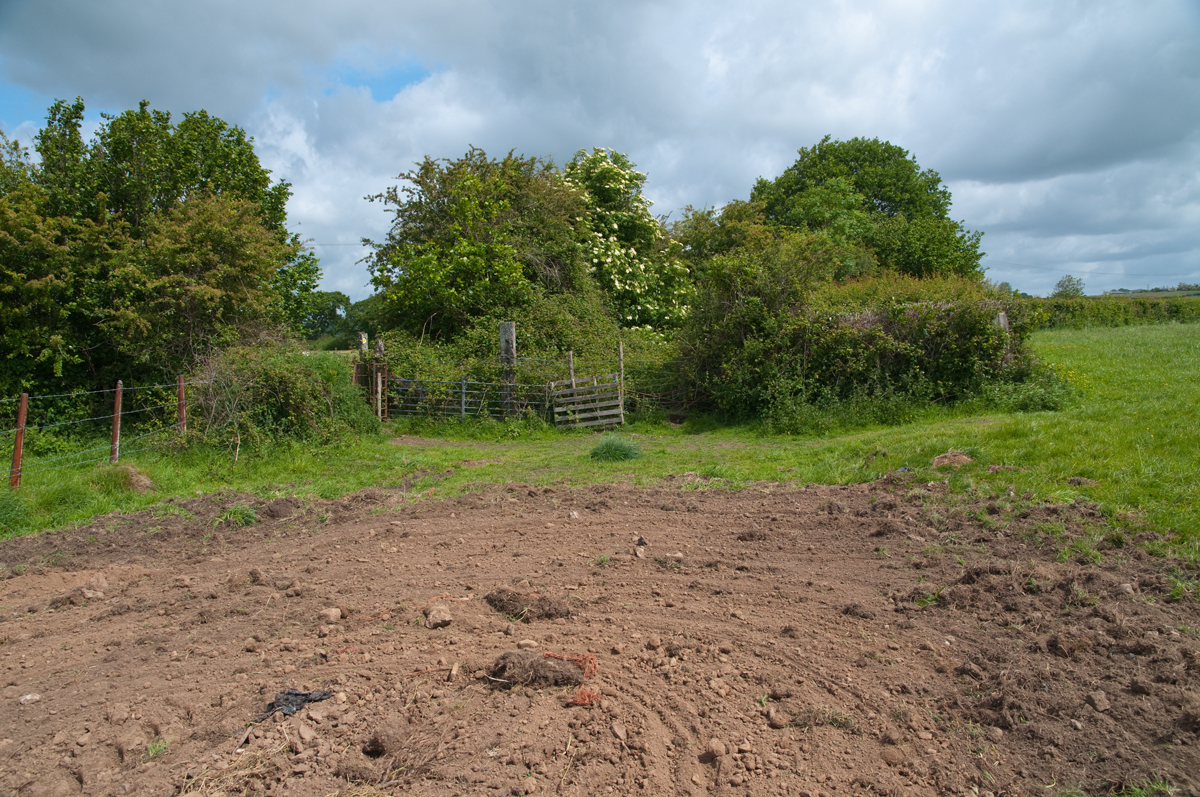
- site of the former station

General information
- Location: Aberthin, Vale of Glamorgan; Wales
- Platforms: 1

Other information
- Status: Disused

History
- Opened: 1 May 1905; 121 years ago
- Closed: 12 July 1920; 105 years ago
- Original company: Taff Vale Railway
Location

Aberthin Platform railway station was a short lived Taff Vale Railway station which served Aberthin, a village north east of Cowbridge in the Welsh county of Glamorganshire.

== History ==
Opened by the Taff Vale Railway it only operated for fifteen years. It was one of four stations (all 'platforms') opened on the Cowbridge branch in 1905 in an attempt to develop new traffic on the line. Like the other three 'platforms', Aberthin Platform was a single bare platform, about forty feet in length and was without any form of shelter. It was located about half a mile from the village and was reached by a footpath over the fields.

== The site today ==
The site is now in a field to the west of the village where a track crosses formation of the old railway.

Preceding station	Disused railways	Following station
Trerhyngyll and Maendy Halt	Taff Vale Railway; Llantrisant-Aberthaw	Cowbridge
