= Llanharry =

Village in Rhondda Cynon Taf, Wales

Llanharry: Welsh: Llanhari
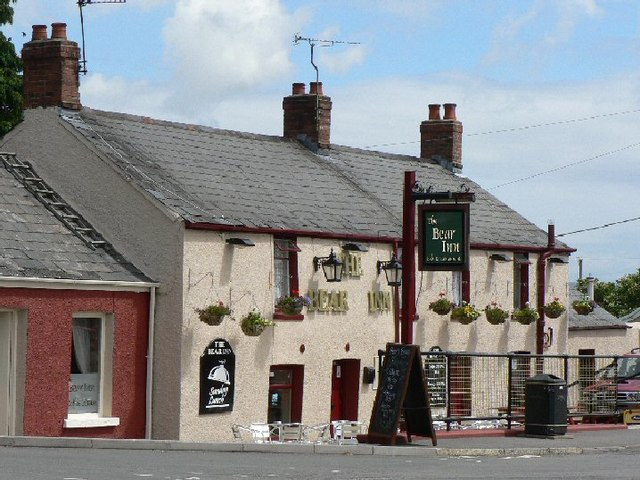

- Location within Rhondda Cynon Taf
- Population: 3,643 (2011)
- OS grid reference: ST005805
- Principal area: Rhondda Cynon Taf
- Preserved county: Mid Glamorgan
- Country: Wales
- Sovereign state: United Kingdom
- Post town: Pontyclun
- Postcode district: CF72
- Dialling code: 01443
- Police: South Wales
- Fire: South Wales
- Ambulance: Welsh
- UK Parliament: Pontypridd
- Senedd Cymru – Welsh Parliament: Ogmore
- List of places UK Wales Rhondda Cynon Taf 51.513°N 3.430°W Community map: Map of the community

Llanharry (Welsh: Llanhari) is a village, community (civil parish) and electoral ward in the county borough of Rhondda Cynon Taf, Wales.

Historically part of Glamorgan, Llanharry has been inextricably linked with iron mining as far back as the Roman period, and for a period in the 20th century it boasted the only iron mine in Wales.

The town is the site of the 1993 murders of Harry and Megan Tooze, which remain among Wales' most notorious unsolved murders.

== Employment ==
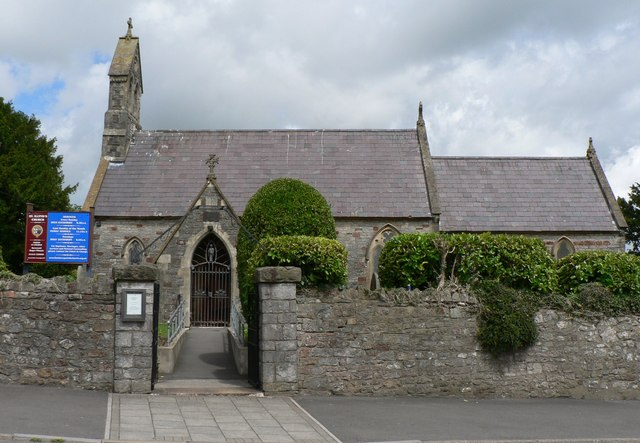
St. Illtyd's Parish Church. Llanharry

Llanharry iron mine worked from the early 1900s but closed in 1976; its main ore was goethite, which was used at the local ironworks.

Since the closure of its mines and ironworks, Llanharry has been in economic decline, as are most South Wales Valleys villages once dependent on heavy industry. Llanharry's proximity to the M4 motorway in Wales has allowed its residents opportunities to commute to work more easily rather than seeking work locally.

Llanharry contains a few small local amenities, such as a corner shop and a hairdressers.

== Education ==
Llanharry is home to Llanharry Primary School, built 1935 and Ysgol Gyfun Llanhari Welsh medium secondary school which was built in 1974. In 2012 the secondary school became Rhondda Cynon Taf's first 3-19 school, opening a new Welsh language primary department in the former sixth form block.

== Public transport ==
Buses are the public transport links serving Llanharry. Between 1871 and 1951, the village was served by Llanharry railway station, but there is no longer any local rail connection. The nearest station is now Pontyclun. The M4 motorway skirts the southern end of the village, but there is no direct local access to it.

== Social life ==
At the centre of Llanharry is Saint Illtud's Church which was built in 1867.

There are no public houses in Llanharry; the Bear Inn closed in 2020 and the Fox & Hounds in 2024. Llanharry has its own working men's club.

Llanharry is home to Llanharry AFC, a football team who compete in the Bridgend & District Premier Division. The team play in yellow shirts with black shorts & socks, and play their home games at The Recreation Ground in Llanharry.

== Local politics ==
Llanharry Community Council is responsible for representing the views of local people. To fund its activities, the Council receives a proportion of the council tax collected in the village.

The Llanharry electoral ward is coterminous with the borders of the community and elects a county councillor to Rhondda Cynon Taf County Borough Council.
