= Prisk =

Prisk is a surname. Notable people with the surname include:

- Charles H. Prisk (1875–1940), American newspaper executive
- Mark Prisk (born 1962), British politician
- William F. Prisk (1870–1962), American newspaper executive and politician
