= Llandow (Wick Road) Halt railway station =

Former railway station in Wales

Llandow (Wick Road) Halt

General information
- Location: Llandow, Vale of Glamorgan; Wales
- Coordinates: 51.4305°N 3.5085°W
- Platforms: 2

Other information
- Status: Disused

History
- Original company: Great Western Railway

Key dates
- 19 April 1943: opened
- 15 June 1964: closed
Location

Llandow (Wick Road) Halt railway station was a short-lived railway station in South Wales.

== History and description ==
The halt was opened to serve RAF Llandow after the development of RAF bases in the area caused the traffic on the Vale of Glamorgan Line to increase. The halt had two full-length platforms, each with a rudimentary brick shelter. Although the base closed in 1957, the halt remained open until passenger services were withdrawn in 1964.

Preceding station	Disused railways	Following station
Llantwit Major; Line and station open	Great Western Railway; Vale of Glamorgan Line	Llandow Halt; Line open; station closed
