= Cowbridge railway station =

Former railway station in Wales

Cowbridge

General information
- Location: Cowbridge, Vale of Glamorgan; Wales
- Coordinates: 51.4604°N 3.4412°W
- Platforms: 1

Other information
- Status: Disused

History
- Original company: Cowbridge Railway
- Pre-grouping: Taff Vale Railway
- Post-grouping: Great Western Railway

Key dates
- 30 January 1865: opened to goods
- 18 September 1865: opened to passengers
- 1886: goods facilities rebuilt
- 1890: passenger station rebuilt
- 24 November 1951: closed to passengers
- 1 February 1965: closed to goods
Location

Cowbridge railway station served the town of Cowbridge in the Vale of Glamorgan in Wales between 1865 and 1965. It opened along with the line on 30 January 1865 after multiple delays, which the engineer of the line blamed on bad weather. It was the biggest station on the Llantrisant-Aberthaw line by quite a considerable margin.

== Description ==
Until 1892, Cowbridge used a decidedly non-standard station layout. It comprised a short runaround loop from which a number of sidings ran off. The first went to the engine turntable. From here, sidings emerged at all angles to various parts of the site. Two more sidings ran back to the engine shed, with yet more serving facilities around the yard. The main siding, having crossed the turntable, branched into three freight sidings. Three short spurs ran from the loop, serving the carriage shed, the goods shed, the cattle pens and the end loading bay. The running line continued on to terminate at a single platform, which was initially without a shelter. The original building was of red bricks with limestone quoins. Later on, a roof was extended over the platform to form a shelter.

== Changes in design ==
By 1886, the growth of traffic on the line was being seriously impeded by the layout at the station. A source of great problems was the turntable. Because it was located at the entrance to the sidings, any shunting activities meant crossing and re-crossing the turntable, causing it to fall into a very dilapidated state. The Taff Vale Railway, which was leasing the line in perpetuity by this time, became very dissatisfied by what it saw as the inadequate quality of the work done by the original engineer of the Cowbridge Railway Company. The Taff Vale subsequently implemented changes to the facilities. The new layout dispensed with the turntable and substantially lengthened the goods sidings.

== Rebuilding ==
The line was extended to Aberthaw in 1892. Subsequently, it was necessary to relocate the passenger terminus of the line. This new station was a single platform with a large red and yellow brick building of the type much used by the Taff Vale Railway at this time. The old passenger station was retained as the goods facility. The new passenger station was not as convenient for passengers. It required a 300-yard walk to the main street. This station remained in use until closure.

== Closure ==
The passenger station closed in 1951 when the railway became a goods-only line. After this, the signal box also closed down. Later in the 1950s, two new warehouses were built. The original passenger station was turned into a warehouse, its front elevation being badly damaged in the process. In 1964, a large amount of demolition and track recovery occurred at Cowbridge – the carriage shed, engine shed, water tower and yard crane were all removed at this time. The remaining sidings were very overgrown, the yard having taken on a very decrepit appearance. The goods service was withdrawn on 1 February 1965.

== Post closure ==
The second passenger station had become a British Legion club in 1954, and remained in this use until 1966. In the early months of that year, British Railways informed the club that the lease on the site would terminate on 30 November 1966. The site was to be disposed of for residential development. The club subsequently moved out and the developers went on site on 28 February 1967. The station site was cleared completely to make way for a new housing estate.

== Crime ==
On 20 June 1902, the booking office at Cowbridge was broken into and a total of £8 11s 0d was stolen. In January 1903, a booking clerk at the station admitted stealing the cash bag at Pontyclun station in December 1902. He also admitted the burglary at Cowbridge and other thefts. The clerk was dismissed and prosecuted.

Preceding station	Disused railways	Following station
Aberthin Platform	Taff Vale Railway; Llantrisant-Aberthaw	St Hilary Platform
