= Ystradowen railway station =

Former railway station in Wales

Ystradowen

General information
- Location: Ystradowen, Vale of Glamorgan; Wales
- Coordinates: 51.4887°N 3.4208°W
- Platforms: 1

Other information
- Status: Disused

History
- Opened: 18 September 1865; 160 years ago
- Closed: 26 November 1951; 74 years ago (To Passengers); 9 May 1960; 66 years ago
- Original company: Cowbridge Railway; Taff Vale Railway
- Post-grouping: Great Western Railway
Location

Ystradowen railway station served the village of Ystradowen in the Vale of Glamorgan in South Wales. It was on the Cowbridge and Aberthaw line.

== History and description ==
Ystradowen was initially the only intermediate station between Llantrisant and Cowbridge. The cutting immediately before the station was the heaviest earthwork on the line, at fifteen feet deep, and itself preceded a stiff gradient of 1 in 45. The station as completed consisted of a passing loop, with the single platform on the 'up' line with one small siding which served a stone goods shed to the rear of the platform. The goods shed was a 'dead end' type, with the roadway diagonally opposite the rail approach. This involved the somewhat awkward process of reversing carts up to the loading platform. When the line was inspected in 1864, the inspector disapproved of the location of Ystradowen station, due to the steep gradients, and the fact that a number of slips had been made in the cuttings. The station was subsequently dismantled and re-located to satisfy the Board of Trade, meaning that it was a considerable distance from the village. It was finally opened when passenger services began on 18 September 1865. The station was much-used on market days in Pontypridd.

Ystradowen station closed in 1951 when passenger services on the branch were withdrawn. The goods facilities lasted until 1960, but the sidings remained for a number of years.

Preceding station	Disused railways	Following station
Llanharry	Taff Vale Railway; Llantrisant-Aberthaw	Trerhyngyll and Maendy Halt
