= Aberthaw High Level railway station =

Disused railway station in Aberthaw, Wales

Coordinates: 51.38934°N 3.38854°W

Aberthaw High Level

General information
- Location: Aberthaw, Vale of Glamorgan; Wales
- Platforms: 2

Other information
- Status: Disused

History
- Original company: Barry Railway
- Pre-grouping: Barry Railway
- Post-grouping: Great Western Railway

Key dates
- 1 December 1897: Opened as Aberthaw
- 1 July 1924: Renamed Aberthaw High Level
- 7 May 1945: Renamed Aberthaw
- 15 June 1964: Closed
Location

Aberthaw High Level railway station was a Vale of Glamorgan Railway station operated by the Barry Railway which served Aberthaw, located near the north shore of the Bristol Channel in the former Welsh county of South Glamorgan, and in the current county of Vale of Glamorgan.

== History ==
Opened by the Vale of Glamorgan Railway on 1 December 1897 and operated by the Barry Railway Company, it became part of the Great Western Railway during the Grouping of 1923. The line then passed on to the Western Region of British Railways on nationalisation in 1948. It was then closed by the British Railways Board in 1964 (as a result of the Beeching Axe) when regular passenger services over the line ceased from 13 June. The line remained open to provide freight access to Aberthaw Power Station and Rhoose and Aberthaw cement works, (only Aberthaw cement works survives as at 2020), and as a diversionary route between Cardiff and Bridgend via St.Fagans when engineering possessions are necessary on the latter South Wales main line.

== The site today ==
Due to public demand and expansion of Llantwit Major and Rhoose, passenger traffic was reinstated on 10 June 2005 on the Vale of Glamorgan Line with rebuilt stations at Llantwit Major and Rhoose but Aberthaw station was not included and private houses have been established on the up platform. Rhoose station also has a bus link to Cardiff International Airport. Three Aberthaw "B" power station reception sidings at Aberthaw East, remain but following the official closure of that plant in March 2020, the sidings and merry-go-round coal delivery discharge lines are redundant. Aberthaw signal box was taken out of use on 9 March 2013 and all semaphore and previous colour light signalling on the Vale of Glamorgan branch signalling replaced by LED signals in new positions and with motorised points all operated remotely from the SWCC Vale of Glamorgan Workstation, Cardiff.

== Sources ==
- Butt, R. V. J. (October 1995). The Directory of Railway Stations: details every public and private passenger station, halt, platform and stopping place, past and present (1st ed.). Sparkford: Patrick Stephens Ltd. ISBN 978-1-85260-508-7. OCLC 60251199. OL 11956311M.
- Jowett, A. (2000). Jowett's Nationalised Railway Atlas. Atlantic Publishing. ISBN 0-906899-99-0.

Preceding station	Historical railways	Following station
Rhoose	Great Western Railway; Vale of Glamorgan Line	Gileston
