= St. Athan railway station =

Welsh railway station

St Athan

General information
- Location: St Athan, Vale of Glamorgan; Wales
- Coordinates: 51.4052°N 3.4545°W
- Platforms: 2

Other information
- Status: Disused

History
- Original company: Great Western Railway

Key dates
- 1 September 1939: opened as St Athan Halt
- 3 May 1943: renamed St Athan
- 15 June 1964: closed
Location

St Athan railway station was a railway station in South Wales.

== Opening ==
When RAF St Athan opened in the late 1930s, it caused the Vale of Glamorgan Line to experience a much-needed surge in traffic. The nearest station was Gileston. Whilst this was convenient for the eastern area of the base, the western part was poorly served. This caused the Great Western Railway to open a new halt on the line. Despite its name, it was over two miles away from St Athan. In 1943, the halt was upgraded to a station to reflect its growing importance. However, many local people still referred to it as 'the halt'.

== Description ==
St. Athan halt was located to the east of a bridge that carried the former main road between Llantwit Major and Barry. From 1 September 1939, the halt had served the West Camp site of RAF St. Athan and it occupied a very cramped position in a cutting. It changed to 'station' status on 3 May 1943 but along with all Vale of Glamorgan Branch stations closed in June 1964. The booking office was at road level and was linked to both platforms below by long ramps. Each platform had a wooden shelter.

== Closure ==
The station closed in 1964 when passenger services were withdrawn on the line. Although they were restored in 2005, there is no longer any station at St Athan. In February 2024 it was announced that the UK government has backed a proposal to reopen the Station.

| Preceding station | Disused railways | Following station |
|---|---|---|
| Gileston | Great Western Railway; Vale of Glamorgan Line | Llantwit Major |
