= Llantwit Major railway station =

Railway station in South Wales

Llantwit Major Welsh: Llanilltud Fawr
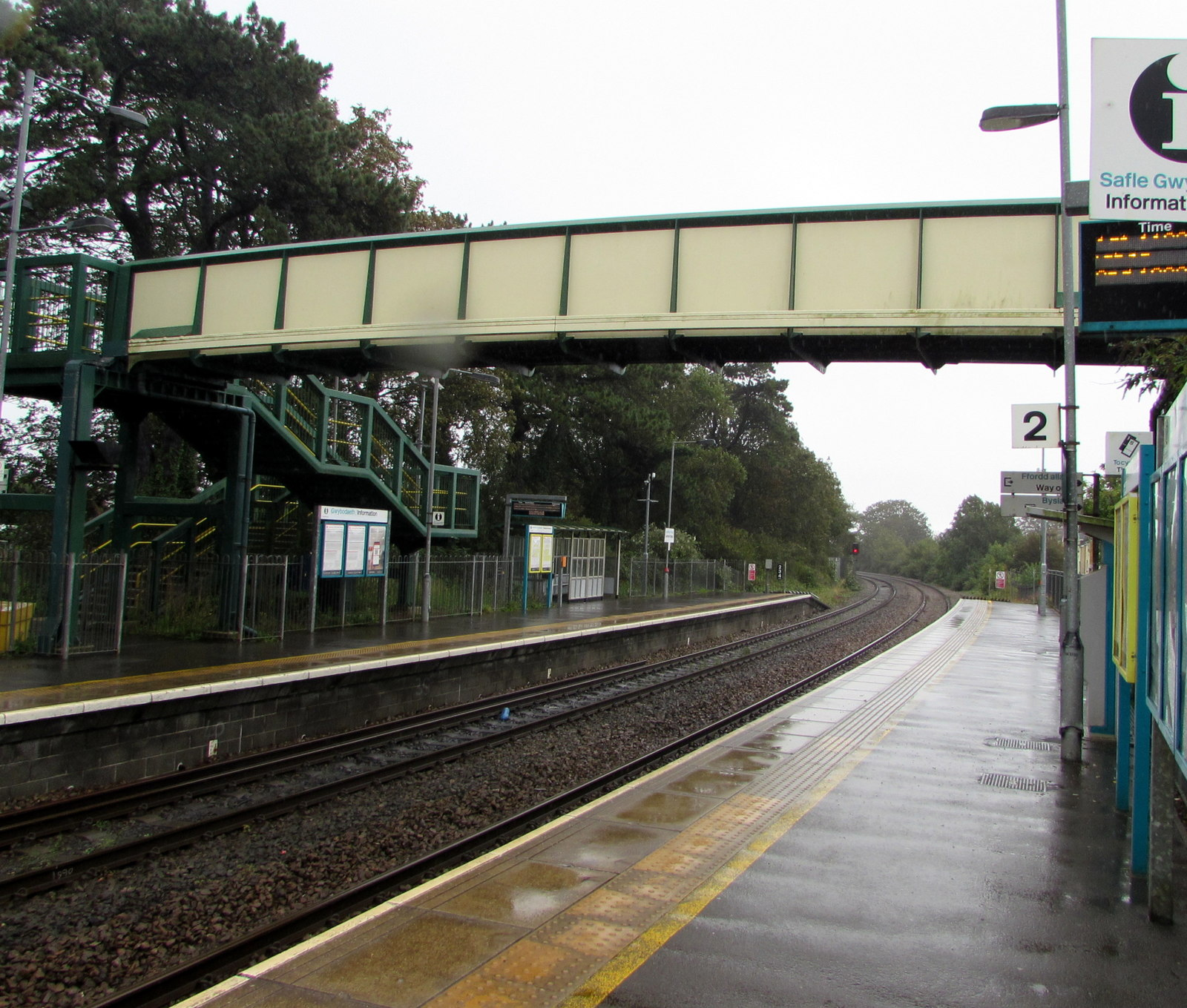

General information
- Location: Llantwit Major, Vale of Glamorgan; Wales
- Coordinates: 51.410°N 3.482°W
- Grid reference: SS970689
- Managed by: Transport for Wales
- Platforms: 2

Other information
- Station code: LWM
- Classification: DfT category F2

Key dates
- 1 December 1897: opened
- 15 June 1964: closed
- 12 June 2005: reopened

Passengers
- 2020/21: ▼51,254
- 2021/22: ▲0.172 million
- 2022/23: ▲0.213 million
- 2023/24: ▲0.237 million
- 2024/25: ▲0.266 million
Location
Notes
- Passenger statistics from the Office of Rail and Road

Llantwit Major railway station is a railway station serving the small town of Llantwit Major, South Wales. It is located on the Vale of Glamorgan Line, 18 1/4 miles (29.4 km) west of Cardiff Central towards Bridgend via Barry and Rhoose. The present station opened on 12 June 2005, when passenger services were restored on the section of line between Barry and Bridgend.

Passenger services are operated by Transport for Wales as part of the Valleys & Cardiff Local Routes network.

== Original station ==
Llantwit Major was one of the five original stations which opened along with the line in 1897. Originally, there were four lines of rails through it. On the line's opening, the village of Llantwit Major lay to the south, separated from the station by fields, but the town has since expanded to the point where the station is now more or less in the centre. The station had two platforms, each with a loop line, with a substantial red brick station building on the 'down' platform. The other platform had a smaller shelter. The goods yard was also on the 'down' side. This consisted of a loop line with a centrally-placed crossover which enabled access to the brick goods shed on the outer line of the loop. Extra sidings were added in around 1900. The station closed to regular passenger services in 1964 when these facilities were withdrawn along the line. The final passenger working at the old station was on 25 June 1965 when the royal train arrived at the 'down' platform. It conveyed the Queen and the Duke of Edinburgh en route to an engagement at Atlantic College. Later, the Royal Party rejoined the train for the journey to Port Talbot where the Queen was to open the new Afan Lido.

== Services ==
Monday to Saturdays there is an hourly service westbound to Bridgend and an hourly service eastbound to Rhymney via Cardiff Central and Caerphilly. Sundays there is a two-hourly service in each direction between Bridgend and Cardiff Central.

Preceding station	National Rail	Following station
Rhoose Cardiff International Airport	Transport for Wales; Vale Line	Bridgend
	Historical railways	
St. Athan; Line open; station closed	Great Western Railway	Llandow (Wick Road) Halt; Line open; station closed
