= Ystradowen =

Village in Vale of Glamorgan, Wales

Coordinates: 51°29′22″N 3°25′23″W

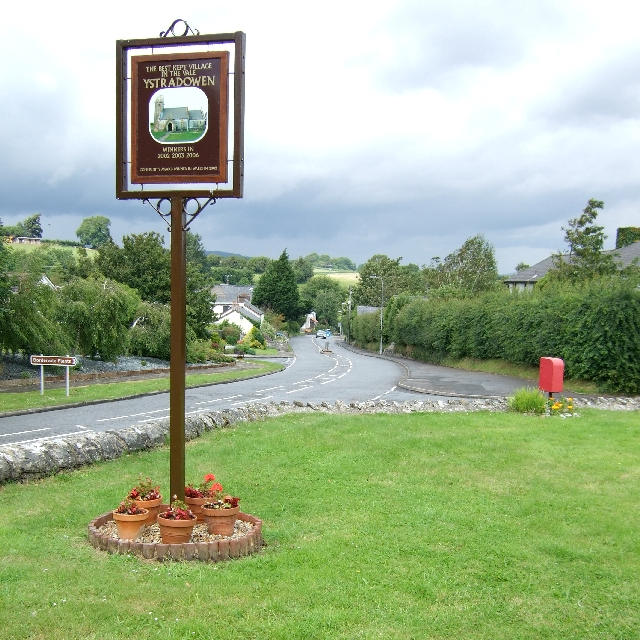
Sign in the village

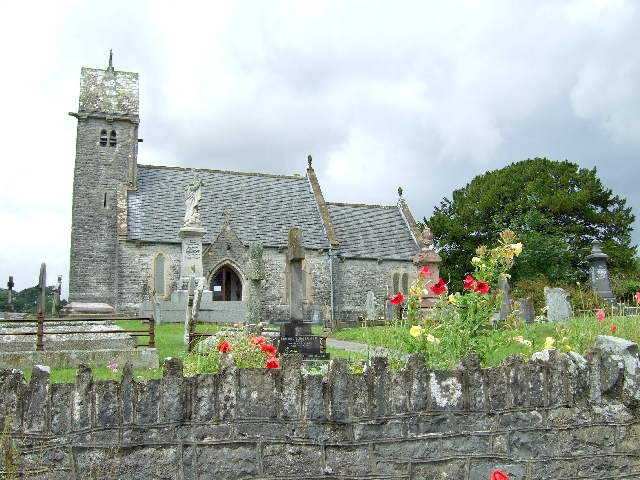
Ystradowen Church

Ystradowen is a small village twelve miles west of Cardiff, located in Penllyn community in the Vale of Glamorgan in south Wales; its nearest town is Cowbridge which is about three miles to the south.

The village was served by Ystradowen railway station between 1865 and 1951. The name Ystradowen means "Owen's Valley" in English. Local amenities include St Owain's parish church, The White Lion public house, Tudor Garage and Seven Oaks fisheries.

Notable residents

Tom Jones had a home in the village until 1998.
