= Llantrisant–Aberthaw line =

Former rail line in Wales

Overview
- Locale: Vale of Glamorgan
- Termini: Pontyclun; Aberthaw
- Stations: 10

History
- Opened: 1865; 161 years ago
- Closed: 1965; 61 years ago

Technical
- Line length: 12 mi (19 km)
- Track gauge: 4 ft 8 1/2 in (1,435 mm)

The Llantrisant–Aberthaw line was a railway line built in two parts.

The Cowbridge Railway was a locally promoted railway line in South Wales, intended to connect the town to the nearby mainline network at Llantrisant. The company was desperately short of money to construct the line, and a subscription of £10,000 from the Taff Vale Railway towards the construction costs ensured alignment to that company's system, so that Pontypridd, and not Cardiff, was the destination of through passenger trains. The line opened in 1865 and operated as a through line from Pontypridd in association with the Llantrisant and Taff Vale Junction Railway. The company was always impoverished and from 1876 leased its line to the Taff Vale Railway. The TVR absorbed the Cowbridge Railway Company in 1889.

High quality limestone workings at Aberthaw encouraged thoughts of a Cowbridge and Aberthaw Railway. This opened in 1892, and was absorbed by the Taff Vale Railway in 1895. The Cowbridge and the Aberthaw sections were operated as a single entity.

The Taff Vale Railway introduced railmotors, which it called "motor cars", on the lines in 1905 and although they were successful, the lines remained loss-making. The passenger service from Cowbridge to Aberthaw was discontinued in 1932; that from Llantrisant to Cowbridge in 1951. A mine working with a private siding remained in operation until 1975, but when that closed, the line ceased to have any railway activity.

== Taff Vale Railway ==
The Taff Vale Railway was planned to bring the iron production of works at Merthyr and Dowlais, as well as coal from certain collieries, to the docks at Cardiff for onward shipment to market.

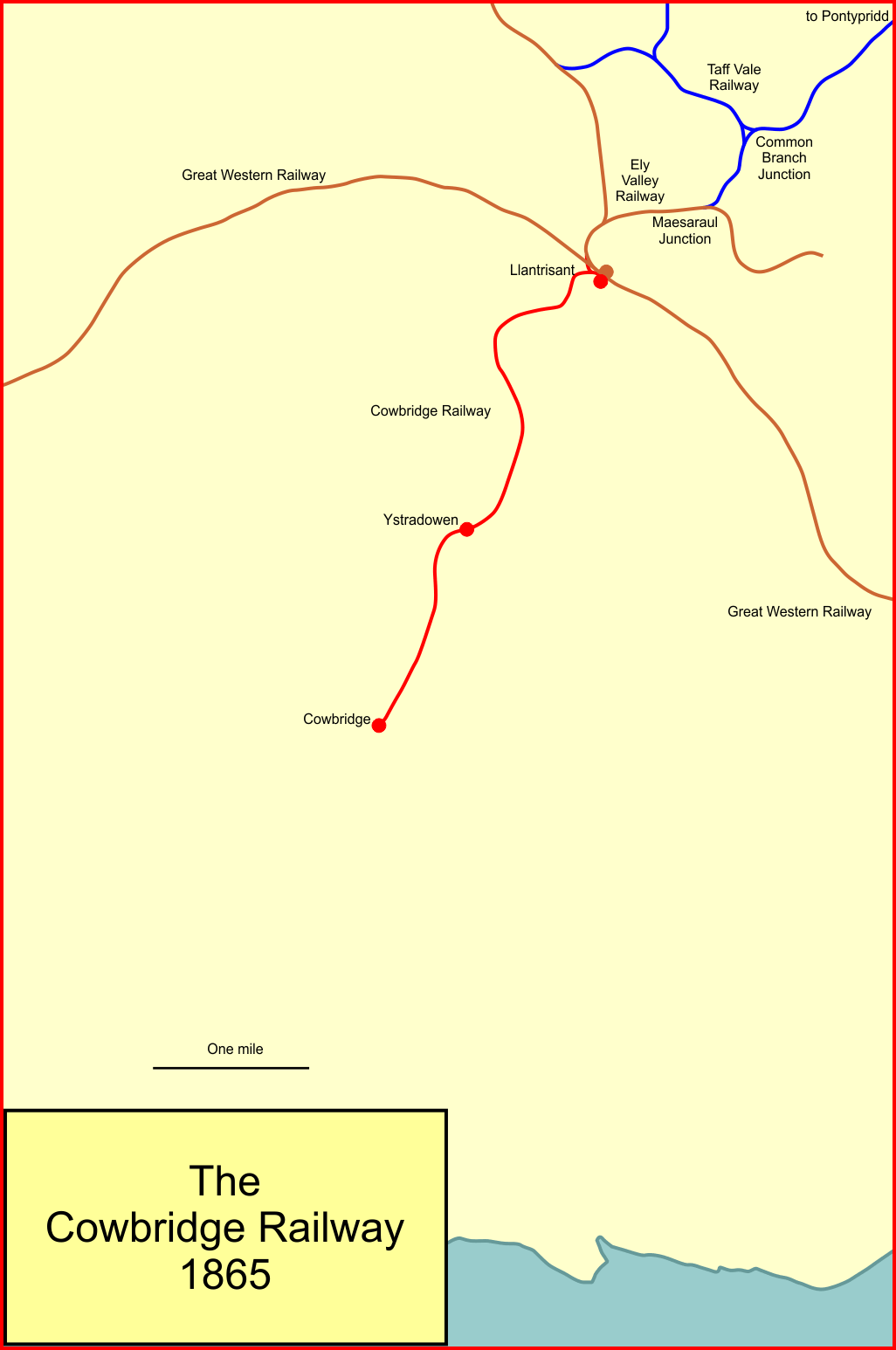
The Cowbridge Railway

It opened its main line in two stages, in 1840 and 1841; it was built on the standard gauge. It was immediately successful, and at the same time coal mining enjoyed a massive increase in volume in the area, so that coal became the principal traffic. This encouraged numerous further branch lines and colliery connections, and at the same time the railway encouraged the opening of new mines.

== South Wales Railway ==
The South Wales Railway was promoted in 1843, to connect the Great Western Railway network at Gloucester to Milford Haven; it was to be a broad gauge line. Its route was the matter of considerable discussion, and at one stage it was assumed it would pass through Cowbridge. However the route as finally determined ran near Llantrisant, about five miles north of Cowbridge; the South Wales Railway opened in several stages but this section was opened on 18 June 1850. The mail road coach service through Cowbridge was almost immediately withdrawn, and the importance of Cowbridge was much diminished.

There is controversy as to whether the people of Cowbridge wanted the South Wales Railway to pass through their town, or resisted it, though it seems likely that engineering considerations took the line further north. As soon as the South Wales Railway opened there was a widespread feeling that the town must have a branch line if it could not be on the main line. A number of schemes were put forward, many of them remarkably ambitious and expensive, and for some time the proposals came to nothing.

== Ely Valley Railway ==
The Ely Valley Railway opened its first line in 1860; it was a broad gauge line worked by the Great Western Railway. It had been built to serve iron and coal pits to the north of the South Wales Railway main line. It was not financially successful and it was dependent on its larger sponsor in 1861.

== Llantrisant and Taff Vale Junction Railway ==
There were iron and coal pits in the area between Treforest and Llantrisant, and after a false start, the Llantrissant and Taff Vale Railway was incorporated by the Llantrissant and Taff Vale Junction Railway Act 1861 (24 & 25 Vict. c. li) on 7 June 1861.

It was to reach Llantrisant station on the South Wales Railway main line, but the final mile was over the Ely Valley Railway. As it was being financed by the Taff Vale Railway, the L&TVJR was on the narrow (standard) gauge, and the Ely Valley Railway was a broad gauge line.

The L&TVJR was to build from the Taff Vale Railway main line, about a mile below Treforest Station, to the Mwyndy branch of the Ely Valley Railway at Maesaraul, where there were important mineral deposits. Running powers were not granted from Maesaraul Junction to Llantrisant Station, which was about two miles south west of the village of that name. It opened the majority of its line in 1863, but the Ely Valley Railway stalled on the provision of mixed gauge track on its line, on which the L&TVJR was dependent.

== A railway for Cowbridge ==
The promotion of the L&TVJR spurred the people of Cowbridge to move forward with their own scheme, and on 1 July 1861 a prospectus for the Cowbridge Railway was published. It was to run from Cowbridge to connect with the L&TVJR at Maesaraul, north of Llantrisant, crossing the South Wales Railway main line a little east of Llantrisant station, with a spur there to an interchange siding. The capital was to be £30,000, as it was claimed that the cost of construction would be far below the average cost of railway construction locally. The benefits would enable local farmers to get their produce to market cheaply as well as reducing the cost of bringing in coal, and also moving iron ore extracted at Llanharry to be transported away.

In November 1861 the Taff Vale Railway agreed to subscribe up to £5,000 towards the scheme, but subscriptions towards the cost of the railway were otherwise very difficult to secure. Indeed the Parliamentary deposit required to proceed with the Bill had to be loaned by the Taff Vale company.

At the committee stages of the Cowbridge Railway Bill, the South Wales Railway once again put forward the proposal that the branch should be built on the broad gauge, which would bring it into the "associated companies" of the broad gauge group. However this last-minute idea was not taken forward.

Cowbridge Railway Act 1862
- Act of Parliament
- Parliament of the United Kingdom
- Long title: An Act for making Railways from Cowbridge in the County of Glamorgan to join the Llantrissant and Taff Vale Junction Railway and the South Wales Railway; and for other Purpose.
- Citation: 25 & 26 Vict. c. clxxix

Dates
- Royal assent: 29 July 1862

The Cowbridge Railway Act 1862 (25 & 26 Vict. c. clxxix) was accordingly passed on 29 July 1862; it had authorised capital of £35,000.

Securing subscriptions continued to be a serious difficulty, and the directors decided to approach the South Wales Railway for assistance; they met them on 4 November 1862. (Note: Chapman is ambiguous about whether it was the South Wales Railway or the Great Western Railway with whom the Cowbridge company negotiated.) They asked the South Wales Railway to permit their company to reach the L&TVJR over the Ely Valley Railway, between Llantrisant and Maesaraul Junction. This would enable them to omit the construction of the northward part of their line above Llantrisant. The broad gauge interest had already shown itself to be hostile to such an incursion, but now the Great Western Railway offered to permit this, and to lay a third rail, forming "mixed gauge", to enable the running of standard gauge trains, for an annual rental of £400.

The Cowbridge directors thought this exceeded the interest on the capital outlay if they built the connecting line, so they decided not to proceed with the request at first, but after further consideration agreed that it was worth pursuing. In fact the GWR agreed to reduce the rental charge to £200, and on that basis the Cowbridge directors concluded an agreement in June 1863. The Board of Trade sanctioned the deviation of the authorised route by which the Cowbridge Railway entered Llantrisant station rather than crossing the South Wales Railway main line.

== Construction ==
The first sod was cut on 9 June 1863. Work seemed to be progressing well and in June 1864 the company informed the Board of Trade of the intention to open for passenger traffic shortly; however this was soon realised to be premature, and was withdrawn. Subscriptions for shares continued to fall short, and in August 1864 it was announced that contractors had been paid with Lloyds Bonds, that is, promissory notes payable in two or three years.

Colonel Yolland, for the Board of Trade, visited the line on 17 December 1864. The third rail on the Ely Valley Railway was not yet ready so no rolling stock had reached the line. Yolland noted that the line was 5 miles 60 chains in length, and that gradients were steep, with a maximum of 1 in 45 near Ystradowen. The down platform of the South Wales Railway (by this time amalgamated into the Great Western Railway) had been altered so as to have a platform face on its south side for the Cowbridge trains, and there was a run-round loop. A standard gauge line owned by the GWR left the Cowbridge line at the west end, and crossed the main line to lead northwards to the Ely Valley line.

Yolland was not satisfied with the signalling arrangements at Llantrisant junction, which did not bring all the points and signals to a central interlocking. The waiting room at Llantrisant was so close to the platform edge as to risk accidents to passengers. Ystradowen station was on a very steep gradient, which could have simply been eased, and as it was a passing place, another platform was necessary on the loop line. Accordingly Yolland declined to pass the line for passenger operation. Moreover the L&TVJR had not provided signalling at Maesaraul Junction, intending to leave it until after the inspection. Inevitably therefore the inspection there failed and the opening of both the Cowbridge Railway and the L&TVJR section was refused also.

On 16 January 1865, the TVR brought an engine over Maesaraul Junction and the mixed gauge section of the Ely Valley Railway, on to the Cowbridge Railway. This engine then worked on the line as a trial. While this was satisfactory, the Taff Vale Railway Engineer, George Fisher, declared himself extremely unhappy with the Cowbridge Railway track. Fisher reported that the works on the line were exceptionally light, and had been executed in the cheapest possible manner. This would result, he thought, in costly maintenance and excessive wear and tear. Considerable alterations would be required before TVR engines could work safely over the railway, and the line would require constant attention and repair during its first year of operation.

Notwithstanding the deferral of passenger operation, an opening ceremony took place on 30 January 1865. An ordinary goods service was started on 8 February 1865, and it was decided that two trains a day would suffice. Messrs Griffiths and Thomas would maintain the line for twelve months, for £500 in cash.

Work on the alterations required by the Board of Trade was complete (except for Ystradowen station, temporarily deferred) and Captain Rich inspected the railway on 22 March 1865. He was satisfied and approved the opening for passengers. However he also inspected the Llantrisant and Taff Vale Junction Railway; he was dissatisfied with the signalling at Maesaraul Junction, and refused that opening. The third rail over the Ely Valley Railway was also incomplete, so the Cowbridge directors decided not to attempt to operate a passenger service on their own branch line until trains could run through to Pontypridd.

== Opening and early performance ==
Eventually these difficulties were resolved and on 18 September 1865 the inaugural passenger train ran. The train service consisted of three round trips daily, of which two continued to and from Pontypridd. A Sunday service of two Cowbridge to Pontypridd round trips was also provided. With the exception of these Sunday trains, all trains were mixed, passenger and goods. Rolling stock was rented from the Taff Vale Railway. Receipts for the first month of operation amounted to £212.

Ystradowen station was opened in February or March 1866. "The Ystradowen station has recently been opened for passengers and goods." To relocate it away from the steep incline, it was now positioned some distance from the village it served.

During the second half of 1865, the gross receipts of the company had been £951, with working expenses of £703. This did not make any allowance for maintenance and renewal of the permanent way. It was stated that "some time must elapse before the Cowbridge Railway Company can have a disposable balance of £1,000 per annum."

Faced with serious financial difficulties, the Cowbridge Railway Company was anxious to lease its line to the Taff Vale Railway, and proposals were submitted to the TVR in August 1866. The Cowbridge Company would lease its railway to the TVR for 3% per annum on capital of £52,000 until 1 January 1870; then 4% for five years and then 5%. Receipts of £1,436 against working expenses of £973 were declared, but this did not include the £200 paid to the GWR for the use of the Ely Valley line, nor for any maintenance of the permanent way which, in the first year alone had cost £500.

Paying £1,560 a year escalating, to lease a railway losing £237 a year escalating, (Note: 3% of £52,000 = £1,560. £1,436 less £973 less £200 less £500 = a loss of £237. The backlog of permanent way repairs was a looming liability.) was hardly attractive to the TVR, and they turned the offer down.

== Financial problems ==
In April 1867 the ironmakers Guest & Co. issued writs against the Cowbridge Railway for payment of £817 owed for the supply of rails. Moreover the Lloyds Bonds which the company had issued to the contractors were becoming due for redemption, and in April 1867, the company went into bankruptcy.

An auction of movable assets was held on 29 April 1867. R. C. Nichol-Carne, the company chairman, purchased some items on his own initiative: the engine turntables, carriage shed, weighbridges, water tank and pump, and leased them back to the Company. Later in 1867 the National Provincial Bank was granted possession of the Cowbridge Railway for unpaid debts.

The poor standard of maintenance, compounding the inferior standard of construction, concerned the Taff Vale Railway, and in January 1869 the TVR directors resolved that "notice be given to the Cowbridge Railway Company that if their line is not placed in good working condition previously to the 1st of March next, this company will feel obliged to withdraw its rolling stock and plant." The deadline passed but the pressure from the TVR continued, and the Cowbridge Railway Company gave notice that it would work the line itself from 5 April 1870.

A service of seven return trips between Cowbridge and Llantrisant was inaugurated, four on Sunday, although this was later reduced somewhat. The TVR was left to work into Llantrisant from Pontypridd, and was obliged to contribute to the tolls for using the Ely Valley Railway from Maesaraul, and to the Cowbridge itself for the use of the standard gauge accommodation at Llantrisant.

The Cowbridge Railway Company opened a new station at Llanharry in August 1871. The facilities were of the most basic kind.

In May 1872 the Great Western Railway altered the gauge of the track in South Wales: now its entire South Wales system was standard gauge, and this obviated the necessity for transshipment of goods at Llantrisant.

The Cowbridge Railway Company had taken over the working of its line, but of course that did not enable it to bring in more income, or to improve the standard of maintenance. In 1874 it emerged that most of the landowners had never received payment for the acquisition of their land in the first place, and lawsuits were now threatened. Repossession of the land was now a possibility.

== Leased to the Taff Vale Railway ==
In March 1875, the company once again approached the Taff Vale Railway. A lease was proposed, but again the Cowbridge put forward unrealistic terms. The TVR offered to lease the line for £1,500 per annum rising gradually to £2,000, and these terms were accepted by a shareholders' meeting on 4 May 1875. The effective date of the lease was 1 January 1876.

The TVR decided that a fortnight's closure was necessary to enable the necessary track relaying to take place. The passenger service was suspended from 30 November 1875, reopening on 13 December 1875. During this period one goods train ran a round trip daily.

On reopening, the through service to Pontypridd was reinstated, and as this reduced the frequent service between Llantrisant and Cowbridge, two extra round trips on the branch were put in.

In 1889 the TVR wished to tidy up the arrangement by which it was leasing independently built lines, and the Cowbridge Railway was absorbed by the Taff Vale Railway (Amalgamation and Capital) Act 1889 (52 & 53 Vict. c. cxciii) of 26 August 1889.

== Cowbridge and Aberthaw Railway ==
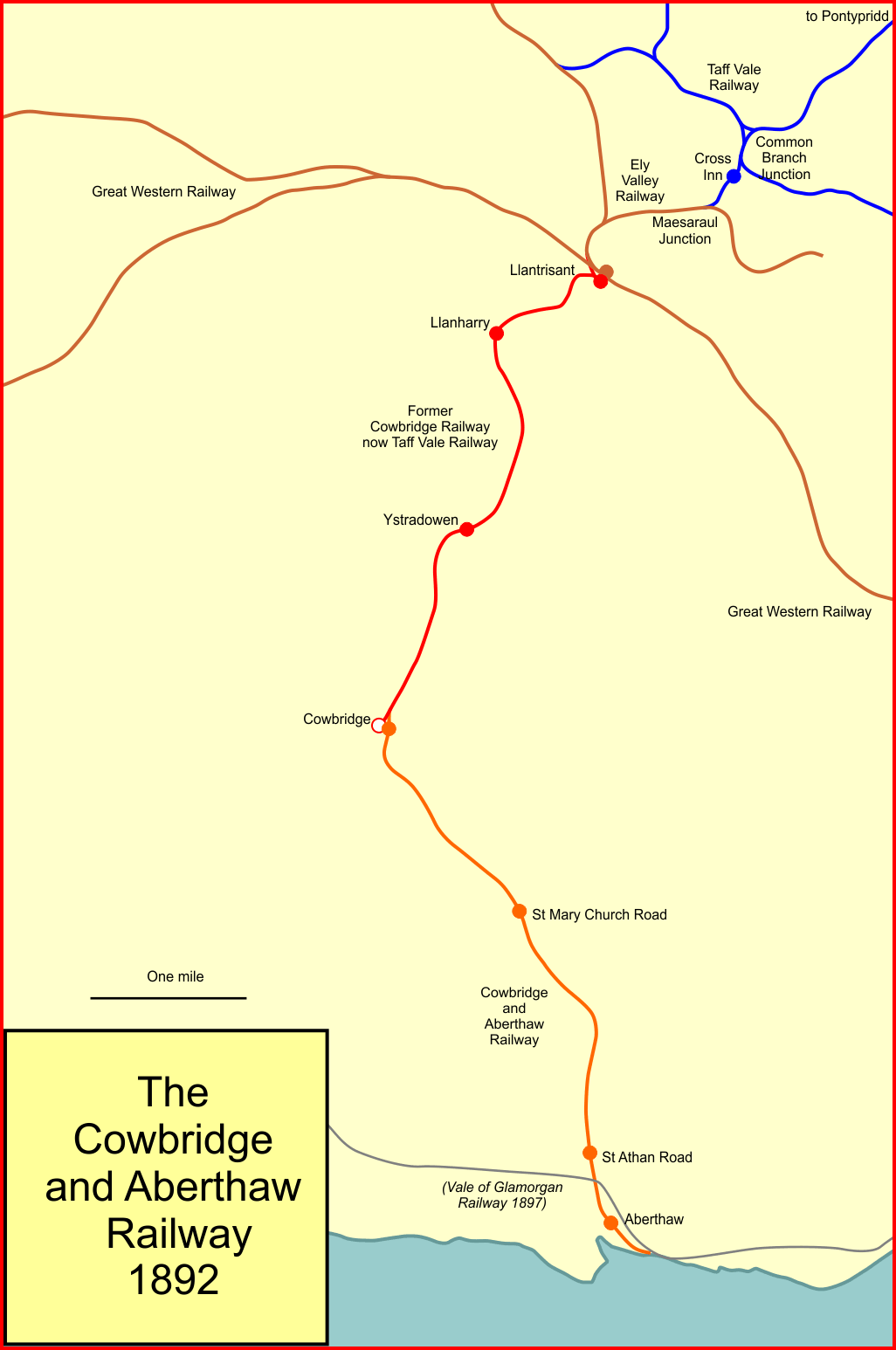
Cowbridge and Aberthaw Railway

Aberthaw had long been a source of high quality limestone, which was in demand for burning to make lime. In 1881 Stephen Collier and David Owen went into partnership with a view to establishing lime kilns at Aberthaw. This was not immediately fruitful, but in 1888 works and equipment were provided and the industry took hold. At this time further railway developments in the general area were under consideration, and in November 1888 proposals were published for the Vale of Glamorgan line, which would connect Barry and Bridgend via Aberthaw.

Cowbridge and Aberthaw Railway Act 1889
- Act of Parliament
- Parliament of the United Kingdom
- Long title: An Act to incorporate a Company for the Construction of a Railway between Cowbridge and Aberthaw; and for other purposes.
- Citation: 52 & 53 Vict. c. cxli

Dates
- Royal assent: 12 August 1889

Text of statute as originally enacted

The preparations for this motivated the Taff Vale Railway to give support to Collier and Owen, and proposals form a Cowbridge and Aberthaw Railway were deposited in the same month. The TVR guaranteed 3 1/2% on the construction cost, and the Cowbridge and Aberthaw Railway Act 1889 (52 & 53 Vict. c. cxli) was passed on 12 August 1889, with capital of £90,000.

Construction of the line proceeded, and on 2 September 1892 Major H. A. Yorke of the Board of Trade inspected the line and passed it for passenger operation; it opened on 1 October 1892. The line was 6 miles 53 chains in length, and had cost £120,000 to build. A new station was provided at Cowbridge as the location of the old one did not lend itself to extending the line, and it was downgraded to the status of goods station. There were new stations on the line at St Mary Church Road, St Athan Road, and Aberthaw. There were three passenger trains a day, running between Aberthaw and Pontypridd.

The Taff Vale Railway was persuaded to acquire the Cowbridge and Aberthaw Railway Company, which it did from 1 January 1895, authorised by the Taff Vale Railway Act 1894 (57 & 58 Vict. c. clxxii) of 17 August 1894.

The lack of a loop to cross trains on the single line at Cowbridge proved to be an operational inconvenience, and a loop was installed, being commissioned in October 1897. The Vale of Glamorgan line opened in that year. It had an Aberthaw station adjacent to the Cowbridge one, but there was no direct connection between the two, for trains or for the public.

== Motor cars ==
In 1903 the Taff Vale Railway experimented with what it called "motor cars": in fact railmotors, that is, single passenger coaches with an integrated small steam engine. The intention was to enable a service to remote and lightly trafficked areas by the provision of low-cost stopping places: in practice these were platforms 40 feet in length, at first with no shelter or other facilities.

The motor cars were introduced on the Pontypridd to Aberthaw service on 1 May 1905. Nine round trips per day were arranged using two motor cars; a conventional service and a mixed train also operated on the line. There were new stopping places, not able to be used by the conventional trains. They were at Trerhyngyll & Maendy, Aberthin, St Hilary and Llanbethêry. The motor cars had heating in the passenger saloons, a considerable benefit compared with the four-wheel coaches on conventional trains. From May 1908 all the passenger trains were operated by motor cars or auto-trains calling at all the stopping places but the railmotor service was withdrawn on 12th July 1920.

In 1884 the Taff Vale Railway had manufactured the "I" class outside-cylinder 4‑4‑0T locomotives. In later years they worked on the Cowbridge trains until they were displaced by the motor cars. However the railmotors generated more traffic than they could manage, and so the "I" class re-entered service in December 1907 on auto-trains.

== Aberthaw cement works ==
In 1909 a significant development of iron ore extraction near Llanharry took place, with a long tramway being provided to make the connection. Further south, the Aberthaw & Bristol Channel Portland Cement Company opened a large cement manufacturing plant at Aberthaw in 1913; it was connected to both the Taff Vale line and the Vale of Glamorgan line although through freight traffic was not authorised. No further rail traffic to or from the works via the TV branch took place after 1932 when the line was closed south of Beaupre, 1mile-3chains south of Cowbridge. At that location, track to Aberthaw Low Level was lifted from June 1934 and the line further curtailed at Beggars Bush buffer stop at Cowbridge station, in 1947.

== Decline of business ==
The passenger service on the Cowbridge to Aberthaw section had declined over a long period. The motor car platforms at Aberthin, St. Hilary and Llanbethêry were closed to passengers on 12 July 1920, so that only Trerhyngyll and Maendy remained open of the 1905 "platforms".

A census of passenger business on the line disclosed that in 1923, 66,140 tickets were sold at Cowbridge station; the branch as a whole excluding Llantrisant sold 87,800. Just over 3,000 tickets were sold at the three stations south of Cowbridge in 1923.

The first daily bus service to Cowbridge was inaugurated in 1920, and proved much more convenient than the trains. A long standing complaint had been the poor connections with the GWR at Llantrisant, so that the dominant flow from Cowbridge to Cardiff was inconvenient by train: it was much better served by the new bus service.

In 1926, a review showed that in 1925, expenses incurred on the branch amounted to £18,423. Most of the income was from the iron ore mine at Llanharry, and the remainder of the line generated little: earnings for the three stations amounted to £133 for the whole of 1925.

This report resulted in suspension of the passenger service between Cowbridge and Aberthaw from 4 May 1926, but the service was reinstated on 11 July 1927. Ticket sales at Aberthaw in 1928 amounted to only 229 compared with 1,187 in 1923; at St Athan Road the figures were 451 against 1,232 for the same years. Passenger receipts from all three stations on the branch amounted to £60 for the whole of 1928, and the GWR announced its intention to withdraw the service between Cowbridge and Aberthaw from 5 May 1930.

The general goods business on the Aberthaw section declined too, as did the small private siding traffic, and the Aberthaw cement works increasingly used the Vale of Glamorgan line as its route for traffic forwarded. By 1932 the Cowbridge to Aberthaw line had become little used by the residual goods service, apart from a small amount of agricultural traffic. The service south of Beaupre siding was withdrawn, and the goods stations were closed on 1 November 1932. The last goods train was handled at Beaupre Quarry siding in 1947, after which the remaining 1 mile 3 chains of line south of Cowbridge was lifted.

== Decline of the Cowbridge branch ==
In 1951, the withdrawal of the passenger service between Llantrisant and Cowbridge was announced: the date was fixed for 26 November 1951.

Llantrisant station was closed to passengers on 2 November 1964. The goods service from Llantrisant to Cowbridge was withdrawn on 1 February 1965, and the branch was closed to all traffic south of Llanharry Iron Ore Mine.

The end of steel making at East Moors removed the market for the iron ore, with the result that the Llanharry mine ceased production on 25 July 1975, and with it the branch closed.

== Topography ==
The course of the line was generally undulating, with a climb at 1 in 66 and 1 in 84 through Llanharry, and a climb at 1 in 45 to Ystradowen and a fall at 1 in 50 after it. South of Cowbridge there was a fall for a mile at 1 in 90 approaching St Mary Church Road but otherwise the gradients were unremarkable.

- [Llantrisant];
- Llanharry; opened July 1871; relocated 2 March 1891; closed 26 November 1951;
- Ystradowen; opened by March 1866; closed 26 November 1951;
- Trerhyngyll and Maendy Halt; opened 1 May 1905; closed 26 November 1951;
- Aberthin Platform; opened 1 May 1905; closed 12 July 1920;
- Cowbridge; opened 18 September 1865; relocated 1 October 1892; closed 26 November 1951;
- St Hilary Platform; opened 1 May 1905; closed 12 July 1920;
- St Mary Church Road; opened 1 October 1892; closed 4 May 1926; reopened 11 July 1927; closed 5 May 1930;
- Llanbethery Platform; opened 1 May 1905; closed 12 July 1920;
- St Athan Road; opened 1 October 1892; closed 4 May 1926; reopened 11 July 1927; closed 5 May 1930;
- Aberthaw; opened 1 October 1892; renamed Aberthaw Low Level 1924; closed 4 May 1926; reopened 11 July 1927; closed 5 May 1930.
