= Côr Tewdws =

Fictional Roman monastic school in Wales

Côr Tewdws or Bangor Tewdws (meaning "Choir" or "College" of Theodosius) is a fictional Romano-British ecclesiastical college that in the 18th and 19th centuries was understood to have been the predecessor of the historically attested 6th century College and Abbey of Saint Illtud at what is now Llantwit Major in Glamorgan in Wales. The supposed Roman college is believed to have been invented by the historian of ill-repute, Edward Williams, more generally known as Iolo Morganwg.

== Forged records ==
In the Iolo Manuscripts, published posthumously by Morganwg's son, Taliesin in 1848, he claimed to have copied a number of 16th century documents which speak of the college being founded by an unspecified Emperor Theodosius ruling before AD 396 or shortly after AD 410 in conjunction with a certain Cystennyn Fendigaid. The latter is a legendary Breton prince turned High-King of Britain who, despite appearing in the Welsh Triads, is generally accepted as an invention of the 12th century pseudo-historian, Geoffrey of Monmouth. The most often quoted of the Iolo Manuscripts is the 'Achau a Gwelygorddau Saint Ynys Prydain' (or 'The Genealogies and Families of the Saints of the Island of Britain') or 'Archau y Saint' for short, a version of the Bonedd y Saint which Morganwg claimed to have transcribed in 1783.

By the end of the 19th century, however, Morganwg's so-called sources had begun to be questioned, by John Morris-Jones and other historians, and the passages outlining the foundation of the college at Llantwit Major in the late Roman period were described as "fabulous antiquity" which "carried back [its history] to impossible people and periods". Between 1919 and 1921, Professor GJ Williams exposed Morganwg as a forger and his works have been rejected ever since.

== Fictional story ==
Iolo Morganwg claimed that the college was established around AD 400 at a place called Caer Worgorn by co-founders, Emperor Theodosius and Custennin Fendigaid (meaning Constantine the Blessed) and was called Bangor Dewdws. In his contributions to the Triads in the Myvyrian Archaiology of Wales, Morganwg further claimed that in "the choir of Llan Iltyd Vawr in Caer Worgan ... were two thousand four hundred saints, that is one hundred were engaged in rotation every hour, both day and night, in celebrating the praise and service of God without rest or intermission." In the run up to and after the withdrawal of the Roman legions, Britain suffered incursions of the Irish, Scots and Picts, who raided British settlements, sacking villages and carrying off the inhabitants as slaves. Morganwg claimed in the Iolo Manuscripts that the college was burnt down in AD 396 by Irish raiders who kidnapped Saint Patrick who was resident there at the time. Ruinous for some years, Morganwg claimed it was refounded by Germanus, "a saint and bishop, son of Ridigius, a saint of the land of Gaul", who appointed Saint Illtud as the college principal of a new Bangor Illtyd in AD 436.

== 19th century antiquaries ==
Morganwg's fictions, including those not published until after his death, were totally accepted by early antiquaries within his lifetime. The founding Roman emperor was identified, probably correctly as Theodosius II. In his notes to the Iolo Manuscripts, Taliesin Williams calls the college 'Bangor Tewdws' rather than his father's 'Bangor Dewdws'. By 1803, it was already being called Côr Tewdws by Morganwg's associate William Owen Pughe in his 'Cambrian Biography', published by Morganwg himself, and this was the name generally followed thereafter. Other antiquarians used different dates to those outlined by Morganwg, which had been contradictory, and some favoured the college's destruction by Anglo-Saxon warbands rather than Irish pirates.

== Bangor Illtyd ==
What Morganwg described as a refounding of the college is generally accepted by modern historians as the proper original foundation, although probably at a slightly later date, in the early 6th century. Whether it was founded by Saint Illtud alone rather than in combination with any of the various Saints Germanus is more controversial.

== Popular culture ==
Cor Tewdws was famously listed in the Guinness Book of Records between at least 1987 and 1993 as one of the claimants to the title of the "oldest school in Britain", although Guinness did note that its early foundation was only "reputed". The 6th century Bangor Illtyd is still probably the oldest known foundation of a school in the United Kingdom.
