= Robert Nicholl Carne =

Rev. Robert Nicholl Carne

Personal life
- Born: Robert Nicholl; 13 April 1763 The Ham, Llanilltud Fawr, Glamorganshire, Wales
- Died: 10 November 1849 (aged 86) Dimlands
- Spouse: Mary
- Parents: Whitlock Nicholl (father); Anne Lewis (mother)
- Known for: Rector, landowner, and a magistrate and Deputy Lieutenant of Glamorgan
- Ordination: 1787

Rev. Robert Nicholl Carne (né Robert Nicholl) (13 April 1763 – 10 November 1849) was a Welsh rector, landowner, and a magistrate and Deputy Lieutenant of Glamorgan. He built Dimland Castle at the end of the 18th century upon land left him by his father, from whom he inherited 99 acres.

== Early years ==
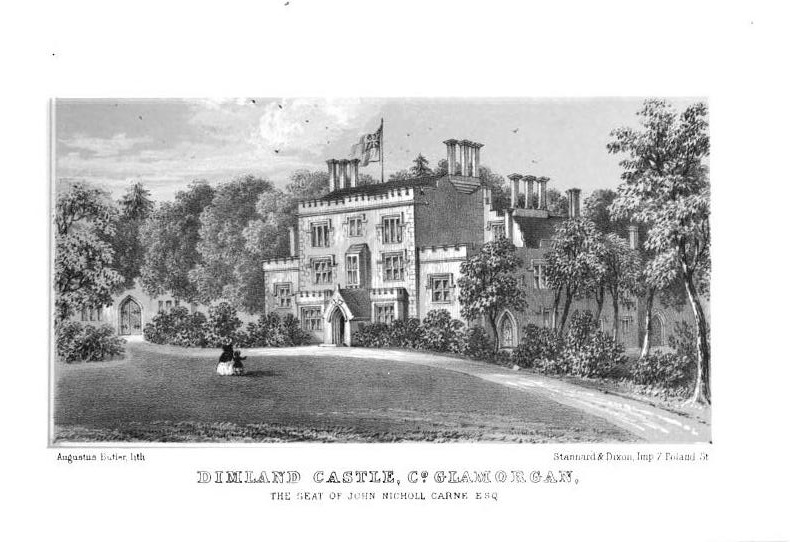
Dimlands Castle, pictured c. 1850, was built by Nicholl Carne.

Nicholl Carne was born at The Ham, Llanilltud Fawr, Glamorganshire, Wales. He was the sixth son of Whitlock Nicholl (1720-1788), of The Ham, in Llantwit Major, High Sheriff of Glamorgan in 1746. His mother was Anne Lewis (1722-1797), Penllyn. His siblings were brothers (Rev.) Iltyd (b. 1743), (Rev.) John, Whitlock, William, and Edward; his sisters were Eleanor (d. 1822), Susan, Anne, Lydia (1st), Lydia (2nd), and Louisa.

== Career ==
He received an M.A. degree and, like two of his brothers, was ordained in 1787. The following year, he became curate of Chavenage House. In 1791, he purchased the Thomas Lewis estate in Llanblethian. By 1795, he was rector of Port Eynon, having moved to Llanmaes House. Records show him to be rector of Llanmaes in 1824.

As the family mansion, The Ham, was given to the eldest son, Iltyd, Nicholl Carne began building Dimlands in 1799 on land he inherited from his father. Nicholl Carne's original property was small in area, said to be 99 acres. He was known to have purchased surrounding properties, amongst which were Caer Wrgan ("Wrganstown"), the site of the ancient castle of Jestyn ap Gwrgant, lord of Glamorgan and the last ruler of the Welsh kingdom of Morgannwg, as well as the Millways, near Boverton, both originally sections of the Fonmon Castle estate. He also purchased the property of the Earl of Plymouth. Nicholl Carne purchased Whitecross Farm from his relative, Whitlock Nicholl of Adamsdown, it having originally belonged to Nicholl Carne's father. By 1817, he owned land at Brynsach and Westfield, and by 1835, a farm in Bute. Through his second marriage, he acquired the Nash Estate in 1842, consisting of properties in Nash and Llysworney, and the Lechmore farm.

== Personal life ==
His first marriage, in 1792, was to Mary (d. 1799), daughter of Daniel Woodward of Chavenage; their only child died in infancy. His second marriage, in 1800, was to Elizabeth, daughter and heir of Capt. Charles-Loder Carne, R.N., and heiress to her uncle, Rev. John Carne, of Nash. They had two sons, Dr. Robert Charles Nicholl Carne (b. 1806) and John Whitlock Nicholl Carne (b. 1816); and four daughters, Emma-Anne, Anna-Maria, Ellen-Louisa, and Frances-Susanna. Along with his sons, and in right of his wife Elizabeth, he assumed the additional surname of Carne by royal licence on 16 December 1842. He died seven years later at Dimlands, leaving the Nash estate to son Robert, and Dimlands to son John.
