= Tresilian Bay =

Bay in southeast Wales, United Kingdom

Coordinates: 51°23′55″N 3°30′51″W

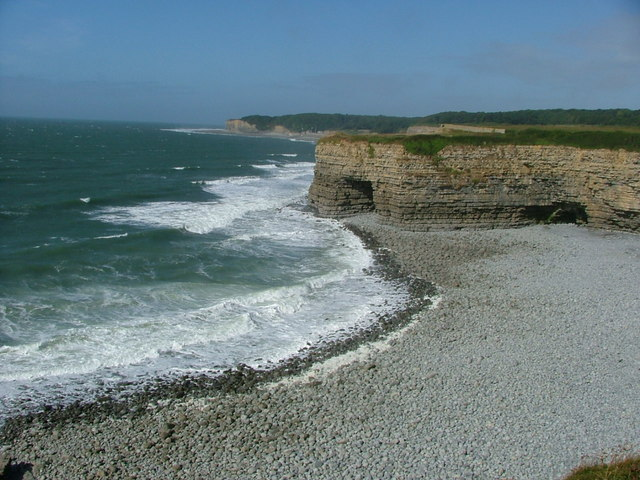
Tresilian Bay from the clifftops

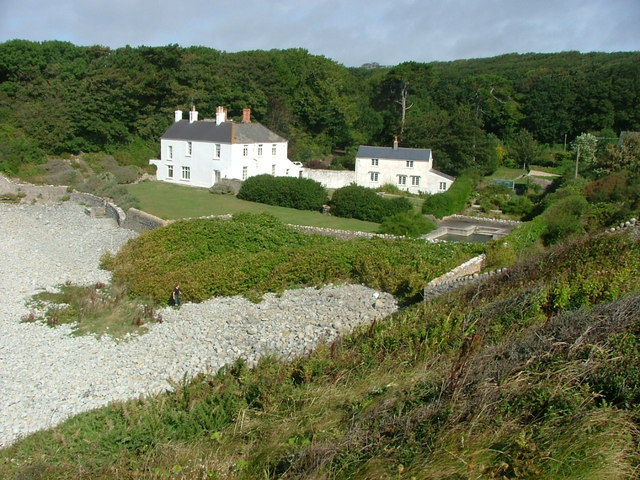
Tresilian House

Tresilian Bay, also Tresillian Bay, is a bay in southeast Wales, west of Llantwit Major's Collugh beach and east of St Donats, on the Bristol Channel. The beach at the bay lies in front of a valley in which the Nant Tresilian flows and empties in the sea. It lies along a stretch of coast and cliff path under protection by the Glamorgan Heritage Coast, characterised by limestone cliffs with many caves and several bays/valleys. There is a distinctive white house, Tresilian House, located at Tresilian Bay at the end of the valley in front of the pebble beach and a pill box on the cliff nearby. The cove of Col Huw is located nearby.

== History ==
Tresilian Bay takes its name from Prince Silian who is reputed to have kept court there in the 3rd and 4th centuries. The bay once had an inn which was frequented by smugglers and pirates. The cliffs in the area are said to contain many secret passages and tunnels which they used. Legend has it that in the mid 15th century, a Breton pirate called Peter was drowned in a cave to the west of the bay by Sir Henry Stradling (1423–1476), seeking revenge after Peter had previously kidnapped him. On winter nights under a full moon his cries can reputedly be heard in the wind. However, George Yates' map of 1799 does not show a building here, but it appears in records from soon afterwards. A lease was granted in 1800 by the owner of the St Donats estate and after functioning for a period as a hotel it became a private residence, most tenants being gentry and farmers. At one time, Tresilian House was lived in by Owen Crawshay, son of Tudor Crawshay, Deputy Lieutenant of Glamorgan and vicar’s warden of St. Illtud’s Church, who lived at nearby Dimlands. In 1862, Dr. John Whitlock Nicholl Carne, owner of the St Donats estate, closed the drive to the public. There is also a cave nearby which has an arched roof known as the "bow of destiny" which is visited by couples who throw pebbles; however many attempts it takes to strike the rock is taken as the number of years they should wait to marry.

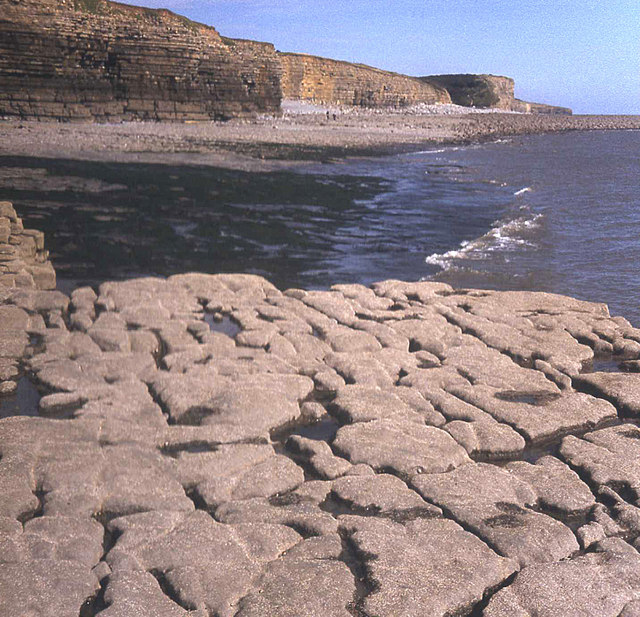

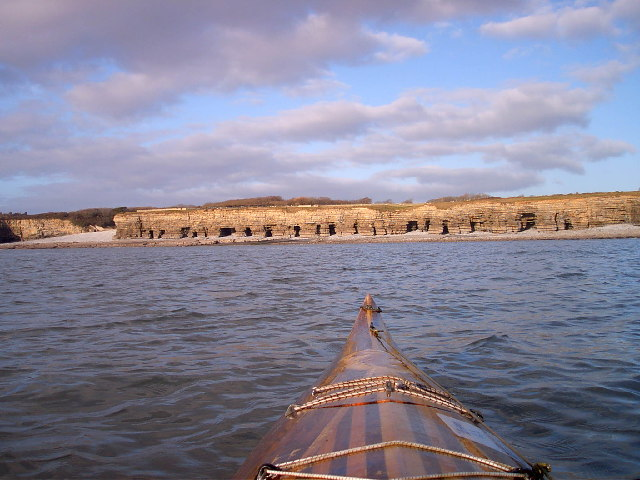

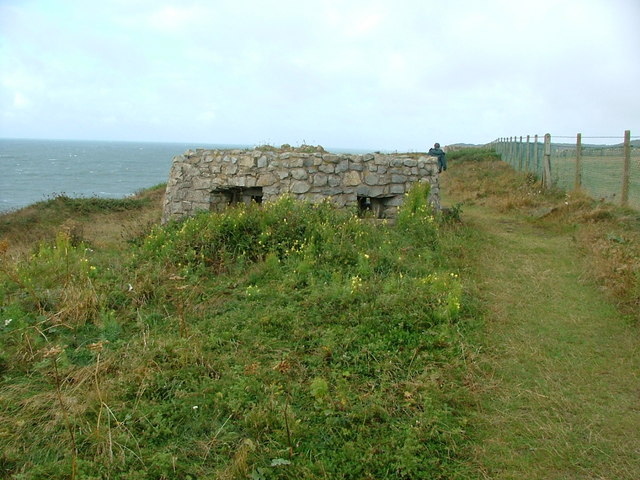

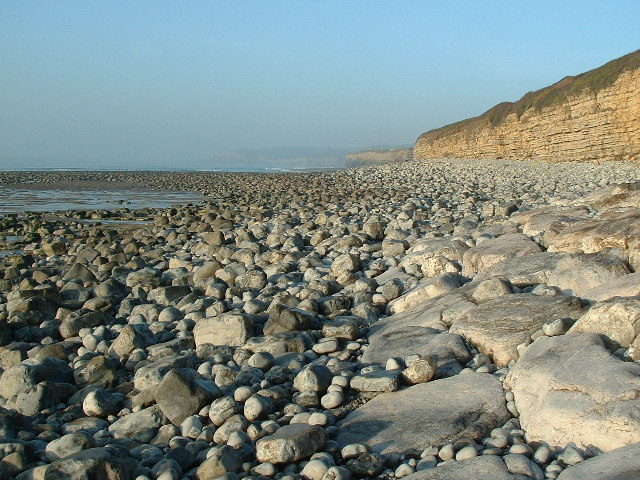

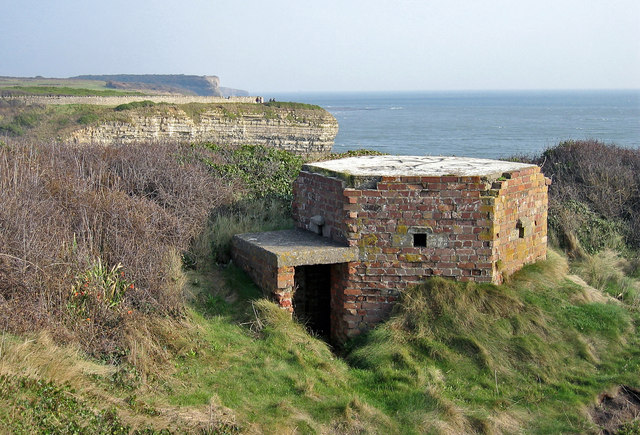

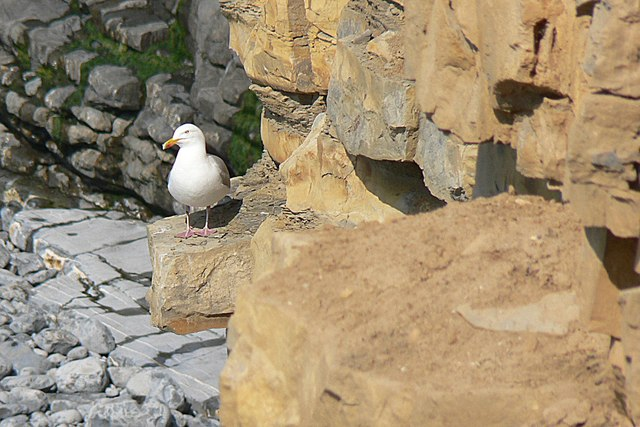

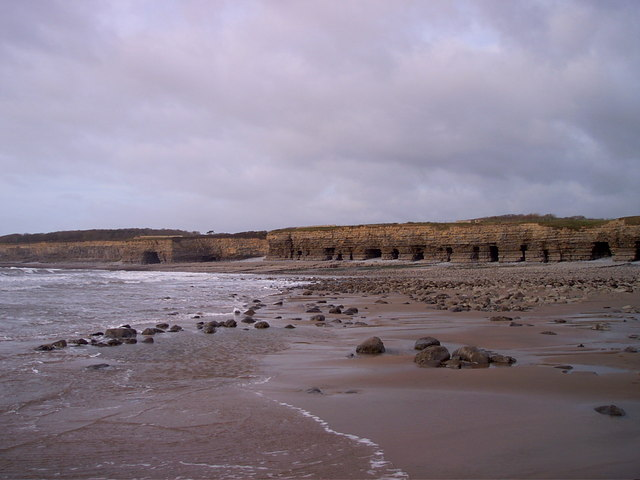
