= Dimlands =

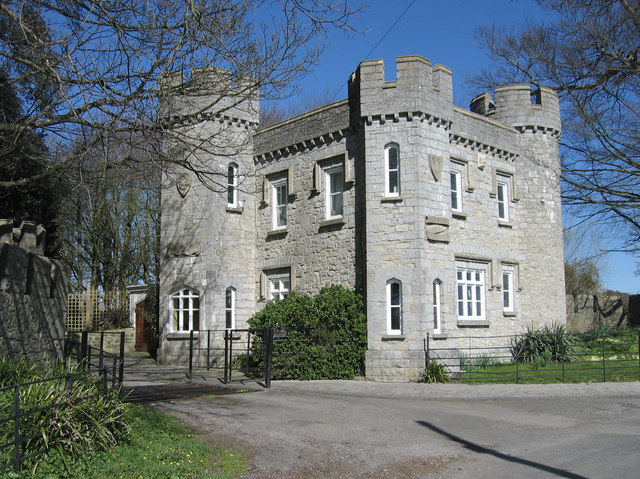
- Dimlands - the lodge

- Location within Vale of Glamorgan
- Alternative names: Dimland Castle; Dimland Lodge

General information
- Type: Manor house
- Architectural style: Tudor architecture
- Location: Near Llantwit Major, Vale of Glamorgan, Wales
- Coordinates: 51°24′22″N 3°30′4″W

Dimlands (also known as Dimland Castle or Dimland Lodge) was a small scale, gentry house on the north side of St Donats Road about 6 miles (9.7 km) southwest of Cowbridge in the Vale of Glamorgan, southeast Wales. Built like a small Tudor castle, it is situated about 1 kilometre (0.62 mi) back from the clifftops of the Bristol Channel between Llantwit Major and St Donats. The main house was demolished after a fire in 1948, but its lodge, in a similar castellated style, survives and became a Grade II listed building on 9 October 1982.

== History ==
The site was previously occupied by the fortress of Iestyn ap Gwrgant, lord of Glamorgan and the last ruler of the Welsh kingdom of Morgannwg; its fields are still known as Caer Wrgan ("Wrganstown"). The property was held by the Nicholl family since the time of King Henry VII. Dimlands was built by Rev. Robert Nicholl Carne at the end of the 18th century upon land left him by his father, Whitlock Nicholl, of The Ham, High Sheriff of Glamorgan in 1746. Upon Robert's death in 1849, his younger son, John Whitlock Nicholl Carne of the University of Oxford, inherited Dimlands, and the 1850 improvements are attributed to him

Dimlands was leased to the architect Sir Matthew Digby Wyatt (1820–1877) in 1875, he being the husband of Mary Nicholl of The Ham, a great niece of Robert. Wyatt died at Dimlands two years later. It is possible that John involved Wyatt (designer of The Ham mansion) in the Dimlands' 1850 renovation. In the early 20th century, from 1900 to 1921, the Crawshays were Dimlands' tenants; Tudor Crawshay was Deputy Lieutenant of Glamorgan, and vicar’s warden of St Illtyd's Church, Llantwit Major. Tudor Crawshay's son Owen was a tenant of the nearby Tresilian House at Tresilian Bay.

The main house was destroyed by fire in 1948.

== Architecture and fittings ==
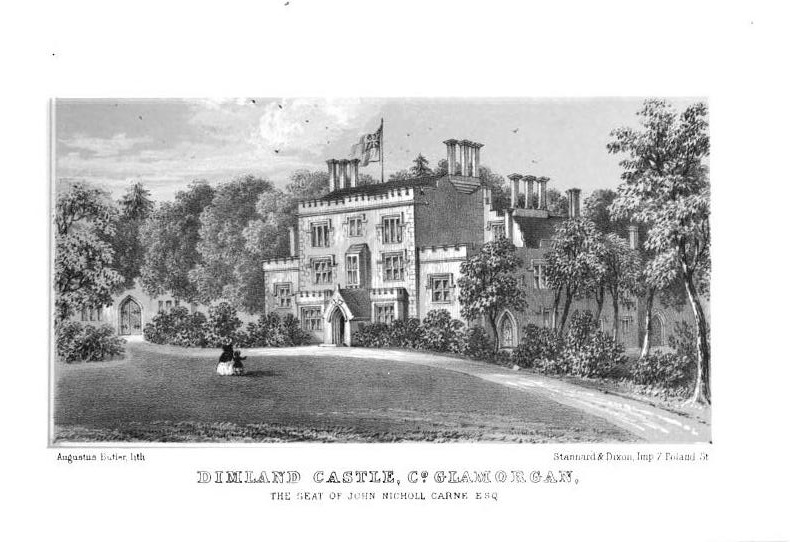
Dimlands, c.1850

Exterior

The dwelling was of castellated Tudor architecture with blue lias limestone exterior, and Coombedown stone windows and cornices. The south facing main front was more than 130 feet (40 m) in length. The western coast of Cornwall and Lundy Island were visible from the south turrets.

Interior

The interior was described in 1853 as follows: "The carved chimney in the dining room is made of Caen stone; the old Carne motto of "+FY ;+NGOBAITH+SY DD+YN. + NUW.+." (My hope is in God) is inscribed on its chief panel. Other features are Mintons tile flooring, the large Tudor style staircase, two sitting rooms, and the library, a newer addition. The drawing room is remarkable for the peculiar shape of its chimney piece; it has features similar to those found in some church arches. It is constructed of Caen stone, and has a label over it, ending in two supporters, with the monogram I:N:C. On this label is the ancient motto "-4-HEB.-fDHYW.+HEB.-TDHYM.+DUW+A+DIGON+". There are several large oil paintings of St. Donat's Castle, Lanrihangle, Llantwit Major, and other residences connected with this family. A later built library features a large fireplace, which is fitted with a dog grate and decorated with white glazed bricks. There are two other sitting rooms, which contain some paintings, including one of Miss Elinor Carne (afterwards Mrs. Thomas Markham) by Sir Thomas Lawrence, done at Bath, when she was only fourteen, and the painter sixteen years of age."

== Grounds ==
The Dimlands stables were built on a small scale. Burke, in 1853, described them as consisting of sharp, pointed gables, which are finished off at the top with the Carne crest, cut in freestone, incorporating a split pelican issuing out of a ducal coronet. On the southern front of the stables, there is an odd carved stone containing the Carne arms, the date of the original grant in A.D. 1336, and the confirmation in A.D. 1842, together with an account of the assumption of the Carne surname and estates through marriage by the Rev. Robert Nicholl.
