= Pat Mountain =

Pat Mountain may refer to:

- Pat Mountain (footballer)
- Pat Mountain (politician)
