= Llantwit Major Roman Villa =

- Location within Vale of Glamorgan

General information
- Architectural style: Romano-British Villa
- Location: Llantwit Major, Wales grid reference SS95886998, United Kingdom
- Coordinates: 51.4192°N 3.4989°W
- Construction started: 2nd century
- Demolished: 4th century

The Llantwit Major Roman Villa was a Roman L-shaped courtyard villa located at what is now Caermead, immediately north of the town of Llantwit Major in the Welsh county of South Glamorgan.

The villa was first discovered in 1887 and was fully excavated in 1938-39 and 1948. There was another excavation in 1971.

The site may have been occupied in the late Iron Age. The first stone structure was erected in the 2nd century. The site developed slowly and, it has been suggested, was even abandoned for a while during the 3rd century. By the 4th century, there was an L-shaped villa with fine mosaic floors, a large aisled building possibly for farm workers and a number of smaller agricultural structures almost enclosing a central courtyard.

Part of the site was used as a cemetery in the early medieval period. The excavations of 1971 uncovered two burials which had been dug through the tesselated pavement of rooms 8/9. Another contorted skeleton was recovered from the corridor.

No evidence has been found to support the suggestion that the villa was somehow associated with Saint Illtud who founded the church at Llantwit Major in the 6th century.
