= Filco Foods =

Welsh independent grocery chain

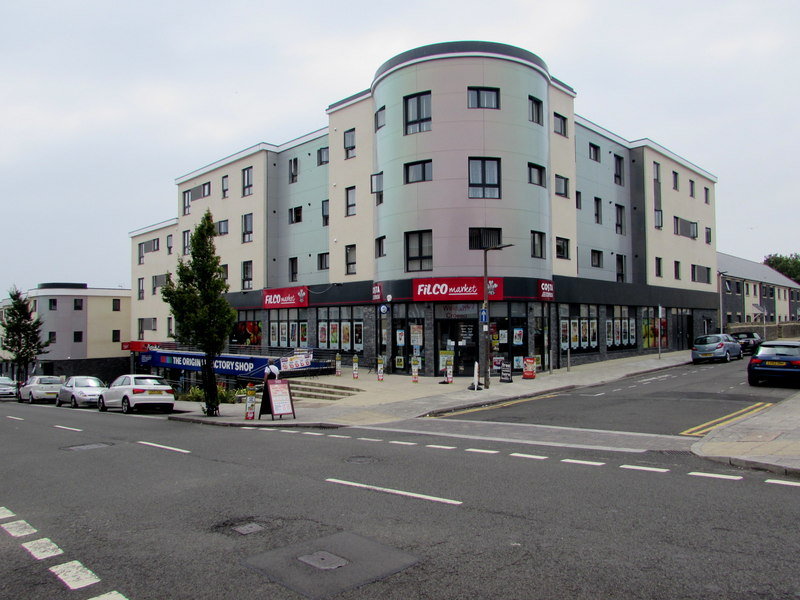
Filco branch in Barry, Vale of Glamorgan

Filco Foods is an independent grocery chain based in Llantwit Major, Vale of Glamorgan, Wales. As of 2013, Filco has 8 stores and operates as part of the Nisa group. Filco Foods was founded by Phillip Jones in 1946. The original location opened on Wine Street in Llantwit Major in 1946. Goods were packaged and delivered according to the customer shopping lists.

In 1964 the store moved to Boverton Road and became self-service. The store brand became Philip Jones Foodmarkets Unlimited and did business under the Spar group. Stores opened in Cowbridge in 1968, Bryntirion in 1970, North Cornelly in 1973, and Talbot Green in 1979. In 1979 Philip Jones Foodmarkets Unlimited left Spar and joined the NISA buying group. In 1982 the Sarn location opened and Caerau in 1990. Philip Jones died in 1997 and Elanor Jones, Ian Hunt and Elizabeth Hunt took over management of the company. The Taibach store opened in 1998 and the store chain became Filco Supermarkets. Filco employees produced a Chariots of Fire style training video titled Chariots of Filco as part of their participation in the Lloyds TSB Cardiff Half Marathon.

== Store locations ==
Bryntirion, Caerau, Cowbridge, Llantwit Major, Maesteg, North Cornelly; Sarn, Taibach, and Talbot Green.
