= John Whitlock Nicholl Carne =

Personal details
- Born: 1817
- Died: 1887 (aged 69–70)
- Education: Jesus College, Oxford
- Occupation: landowner, magistrate, barrister

John Whitlock Nicholl Carne (né John Whitlock Nicholl; later John Whitlock Stradling Carne) (1817–1887) FSA, JP, DCL, was a Welsh landowner, magistrate, and barrister. His seat was Dimlands.

== Early years ==
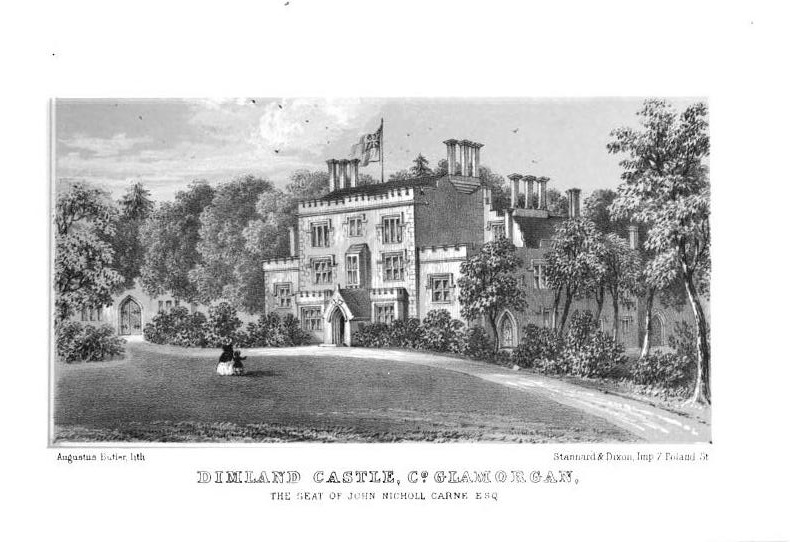
Dimlands Castle, pictured c. 1850, seat of John Whitlock Nicholl Carne.

Nicholl Carne was born at Dimlands in the Vale of Glamorgan, southeast Wales. His father was the Rev. Robert Nicholl Carne, a rector, magistrate and Deputy Lieutenant of Glamorgan, who built Dimlands at the end of the 18th century upon land left him by his father, from whom he inherited 99 acres. Nicholl Carne' mother was Elizabeth, daughter and heir of Capt. Charles-Loder Carne, R.N., and heiress to her uncle, Rev. John Carne, of Nash. He had an older brother, Dr. Robert Charles Nicholl Carne (born 1806); and four sisters, Emma-Anne, Anna-Maria, Ellen-Louisa, and Frances-Susanna. Nicholl Carne was educated at Jesus College, Oxford, matriculating in 1833, at the age of 17, and receiving his bachelor's degree in 1837, Master of Arts in 1839, and Doctor of Civil Law in 1843.

== Career ==
Nicholl Carne was called to the Bar by the Society of the Inner Temple in 1840. He was a barrister on the South Wales and Oxford Circuits. He served as Chairman of Cowbridge Bench of Magistrates, Chairman of P. Sessions, and Commissioner in Bankruptcy. He became High Sheriff of Glamorgan in 1874.

He took up residence at Tresilian Bay in 1844. Subsequent to the death of his father in 1849, he inherited and moved to Dimlands, which adjoined Tresilian. It is possible that Nicholl Carne involved the architect Sir Matthew Digby Wyatt in the Dimlands' 1850 renovation. In 1854, he inherited the Parc-Newydd estate, notable for the Llanwynno coal seams.

In 1860 (some sources say 1861), he acquired St Donat's Castle and estate. He spent more than £30,000, restoring 42 of the 70 rooms. After his older brother's death, he inherited the Nash estate in 1869. Four years later, records show that he owned 3,217 acres (1,302 ha) in Glamorgan.

== Personal life ==
He married Mary Jane, daughter of Peter Whitfield Bracker, of Liverpool. They had three sons, Edward-Stradling-Nicholl (1849–1862), John-Devereux-Van Loder-Nicholl Carne (1854–1905), Mansel-Sydney-Berkrolles-Nicholl Carne (1863–1892), Elizabeth Mary (born 1868), Grace Mansel Carne, Blanch Elinor (died 1865), Eva Loder Brancker (d.1862), Mabel Gwladys St. Maur, and Bertha Gamage De Lacy.

Nicholl Carne was Patron of St Donats Vicarage. By right of his mother, and along with his father and brother, he assumed the additional surname of Carne by royal licence on 16 December 1842. In 1877, he assumed the surname of Stradling Carne in lieu of Nicholl.
