= Pat Mountain (footballer) =

Welsh footballer

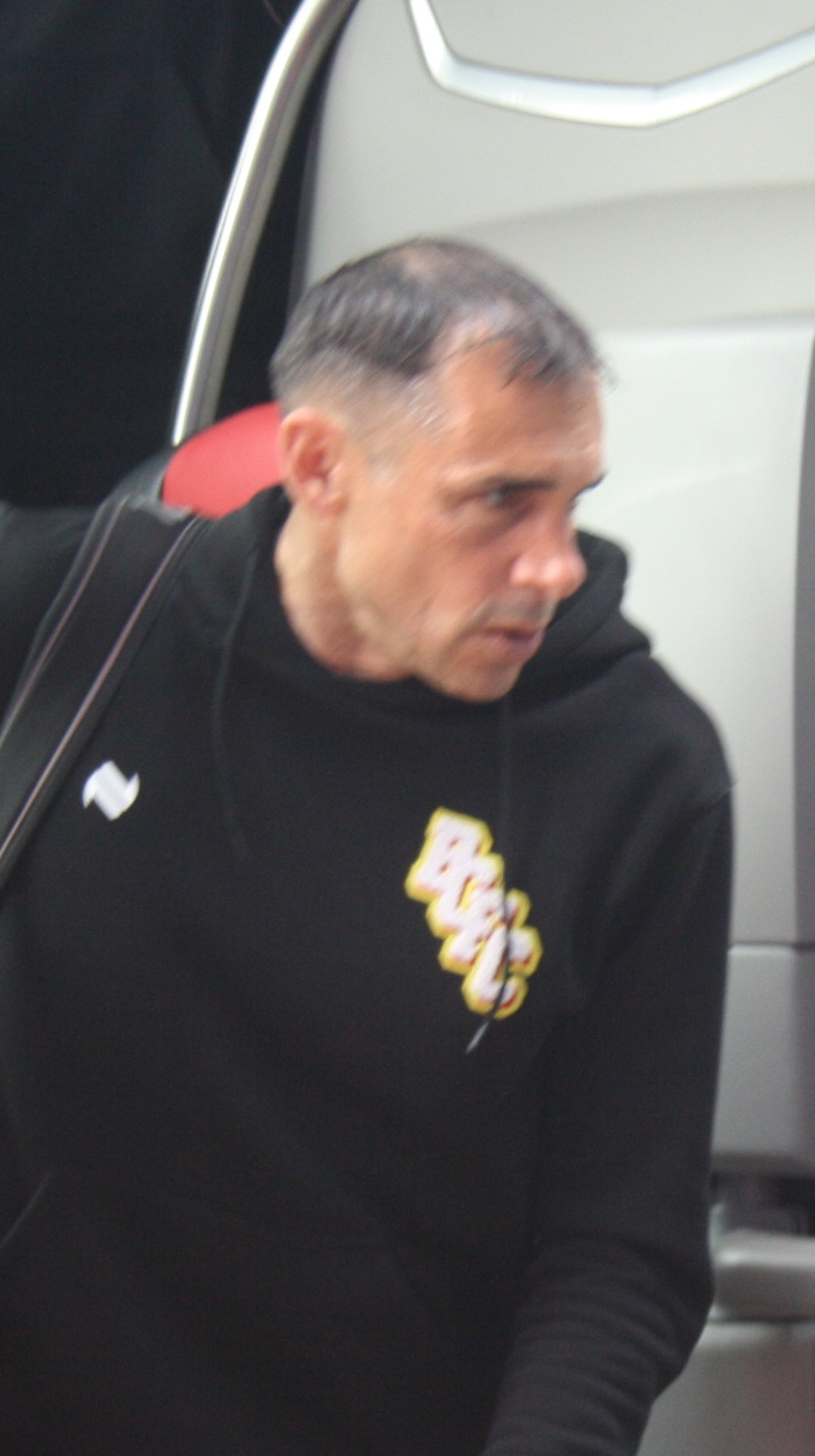
- Mountain in 2026

Personal information
- Full name: Patrick Douglas Mountain
- Date of birth: 1 August 1976 (age 50)
- Place of birth: Pontypridd, Wales
- Position: Goalkeeper

Team information
- Current team: Bristol City (Goalkeeper coach)

Senior career*
| Years | Team | Apps | (Gls) |
| 1995–1996 | Barry Town | ? | (?) |
| 1996–1998 | Cardiff City | 5 | (0) |
| 1996 | → Barry Town (loan) | ? | (?) |
| 1998 | Barry Town | 8 | (0) |
| 1998–1999 | Yeovil Town | 0 | (0) |
| 1998–1999 | Gloucester City | ? | (0) |
| 1999 | Barry Town | 1 | (0) |
| 1999–2003 | Newport County | 205 | (0) |

International career
- Wales U21
- * Club domestic league appearances and goals

Patrick Douglas "Pat" Mountain (born 1 August 1976) is a Welsh former professional footballer who played as a goalkeeper. He has been goalkeeping coach for Bristol City since 2019.

== Background ==
Born in Pontypridd, Pat grew up in Llantwit Major. He won three schoolboy international caps.

== Club career ==
Mountain began his career at Barry Town and appeared for them in the UEFA Cup where he helped them to a win over BVSC Budapest before bring eliminated by Aberdeen. His impressive performances caused Cardiff City to take notice and he signed for them on a non-contract basis as cover. Following an injury to the first choice goalkeeper he started a handful of games for the Bluebirds, making his debut in a 2–1 defeat against Mansfield Town. During his time at the club he went on loan to Barry Town eventually returning to them on a permanent deal. He left Barry Town to sign for Yeovil Town in 1998 and eventually moved on to Newport County via Gloucester City. He went on to make over 200 appearances for the side and won player of the year awards on two separate occasions .

He was eventually forced to retire at the age of just 27 due to persistent knee problems which, despite having three major operations on, he could not recover from.

== International career ==
Mountain has represented Wales in four different age levels and is a former Wales U21 international and was a regular in the side for several years.

== After retirement ==
After being forced to retire from playing through injury, Mountain obtained UEFA's outfield and goalkeeping coaching 'A' licences. He is also an FA accredited tutor of goalkeepers and has both their 'A' and 'B' licence qualifications.

Mountain started his coaching career at Cardiff City working with the academy goalkeepers before moving on to work with Cheltenham Town and Hereford United as first team goalkeeper coach.

On 7 August 2008 it was confirmed that Mountain had signed for Football League Championship club Wolverhampton Wanderers as their Goalkeeper Coach replacing Bobby Mimms. Mountain has worked with former Wolves associates in John Ward, Keith Downing and Graham Turner.

On 20 June 2017, Mountain was appointed as Goalkeeping Coach for Hull City.

On 22 January 2018, Mountain left Hull City for family reasons, taking up a similar position at Forest Green Rovers.

On 14 June 2019, he became Goalkeeping Coach at EFL Championship Side Bristol City F.C.
