= Illtud =

6th-century Welsh saint

Saint Illtud
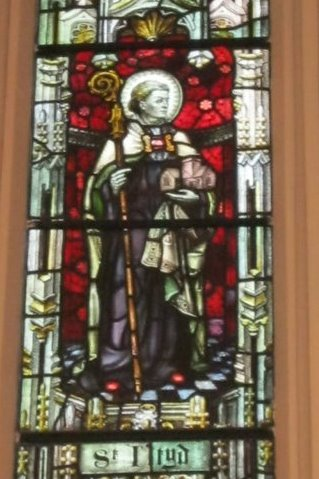

Illtud Farchog – Illtud the Knight
- Born: 5th century Ewyas, Wales–England border, Monmouthshire and Herefordshire
- Died: Llantwit Major, Wales
- Venerated in: Roman Catholicism; Anglican Communion; Eastern Orthodoxy
- Major shrine: Llanilltud Fawr, Glamorgan Wales, Loc Ildut, Sizun, Pen-ar-Bed/Finisterre, Brittany
- Feast: 6 November

Illtud (Welsh pronunciation: [/ˈɪɬtɨd/] also spelled Illtyd, Eltut, and, in Latin, Hildutus), also known as Illtud Farchog or Illtud the Knight, is venerated as the abbot teacher of the divinity school, Bangor Illtyd, located in Llanilltud Fawr (Llantwit Major) in Glamorgan, Wales. He founded the monastery and college in the 6th century, and the school is believed to be Britain's earliest centre of learning. At its height, it had over a thousand pupils and schooled many of the great saints of the age, such as David, Samson of Dol, and the historian Gildas.

== Hagiography ==
Illtud was popular among the very ancient Celts, but there are few dependable sources about his life story. The earliest mention of Illtud is in the Vita Sancti Sampsonis, written in Dol, Brittany, about 600 AD. According to this account, Illtud was the disciple of Bishop Germanus. While commonly thought to be Germanus of Auxerre, chronological evidence indicates that it was actually Germain of Paris. Furthermore, the 9th Century Life of St. Brioc states that Illtud was educated by Germanus in Paris. According to the Sampson biography, Illtud was the most accomplished of all the Britons, and was well versed in the scriptures of the Old and New Testaments, as well as every type of philosophy, including geometry, rhetoric, grammar, and arithmetic. He was also "gifted with the power of foretelling future events". It appears that he was an educated Briton living shortly after Rome's departure from the West.

According to Life of St. Illtud written circa 1140, Illtud was the son of a Breton prince and a cousin of King Arthur. According to this Life, Illtud's parents intended him for service in the church and had him educated in literature for this purpose. However, he forsook his religious upbringing, choosing instead to pursue a military career. He took a wife named Trynihid, and became a soldier in western Britain (now Wales), in service first to King Arthur, and then to the King Poulentus. As a result of this, he is sometimes called Illtud the Knight. One afternoon, he took a hunting party onto the lands of Cadoc. The party sent a message to the abbot, demanding that the abbot feed them. The abbot deemed their demand to be very rude and improper, but graciously offered them a meal anyway. Before they could enjoy the meal, the ground opened up and swallowed the whole party as just punishment for their impiety. Only Illtud was spared, and he went to St. Cadog on his knees, begging forgiveness for his sinful act. The abbot told him to give up his selfish ways and go back to his religious upbringing. Inspired, Illtud drove out his wife, and became a hermit in the Vale of Glamorgan (a matrimonial detail which was regarded as dubious).

Illtud helped pioneer the monastic life of Wales by founding a monastery in what is now Llantwit Major. This became the first major Welsh monastic school, and was a hub of Celtic Christianity in Sub-Roman Britain. Illtud's own pupils are reckoned to have included seven sons of British princes and scholars such as Saint Patrick, Paul Aurelian, Taliesin, Gildas and Samson of Dol. David is also believed to have spent some time there.

== Cult and veneration ==
Saint Illtud's feast day and commemoration is celebrated on 6 November, but the great 'pardon of Ildut' at Locildut in Brittany is held on the last Sunday of July. According to legend, Illtud was buried west of the town of Brecon, in the church of Llanilltud (sometimes called Capel Illtud, which was demolished in the late 20th century), on a tract of moorland known as Mynydd Illtud. Near this church, there is a megalithic monument called Bedd Gwyl Illtyd, or the "Grave of St. Illtud's Eve." Until comparatively recently, Illtud was honoured by the practice of ‘watching’ (keeping vigil) at this stone before his festival.

The Life tells of Illtyd's bell being recovered from the armies of King Edgar the Peaceful and of Illtyd's protecting his people against the people of yr Hen Ogledd in the time of William the Conqueror. There is also a cross, probably of the ninth century, bearing the inscription: SAMSON POSUIT HANC CRUCEM PRO ANIMA EIUS ILITET SAMSON REGIS SAMUEL ERISAR – "Samson placed his Cross here for his soul, for the soul of Illtud, Samson, Rhain, Sawyl and Ebisar".

There is no formal evidence for a cult of Illtyd surviving from before the 11th century. However, in Celtic countries it is the names of places that tell us most about the existence and veneration of the saints during the oldest times. The town of Llanilltud Fawr (Llantwit Major in English) where Illtud's college is located is of course named for him (Welsh: llan church enclosure + Illtud + mawr great. Literally, Illtud's great church), and was the chief centre of the cult of Saint Illtud. In Glamorgan many churches are dedicated to him, first and foremost St Illtyd's Church, Llantwit Major, which stands on what is believed to have been the site of the monastery. Many other places are dedicated to him is because they belonged to the Llantwit monastery. Near to Llantwit itself are the villages of Llantrithyd, Llantwit Fardre, and Llantrisant and at Newcastle and Bridgend churches are dedicated to Saint Illtud. In Brecknockshire, the church at Llanhamlach east of Brecon is dedicated to him, and lies south of a Megalithic grave called Ty Illtud, which was a site of mediaeval pilgrimage, the inside walls of the grave bearing incised crosses. The grave is thought to have been a retreat of Illtud, as was a similar megalithic monument Roc'h Ildut near Coadut (Coat Ildut/Coed Illtud/ Illtud's Wood) in Brittany, demolished in the 19th century. Llantrisant's three saints were Illtud, Gwynno and Tyfodwg. In Merthyr Tudful there are holy wells of Gwynno and Illtud. West of Brecon, the church of Llanilltud is on a mountain known as Mynydd Illtud. Dedications in and around Gower include Ilston, formerly Llanilltud Gwyr, Oxwich, a holy well of S. Iltut in Llanrhidian, Llanilltud Fach, or Llantwit-juxta-Neath and Pen-bre. A 13th-century church on Caldey Island, Pembrokeshire, is dedicated to Illtud. In North Wales, there is a Llanelltyd near Dolgellau. In Brittany, there are approximately 24, if other place-names like Aberildut are included; largely confined to the ancient dioceses of Leon, Treguier and Vannes, with small outliers in the region of Saint Malo, originally in the diocese of his pupil Samson.

John Stow's 1603 list of the bishops of London includes an "Iltuta" who is sometimes conflated with Illtud.

== Arthurian connections ==
According to the 12th century Life of St. Illtud, Illtud's father was Bicanus, a minor Breton prince, and his mother was Rieingulid, a princess and daughter of Anblaud, king of Lesser Britain (Brittany). He was alleged to be the cousin of the legendary King Arthur, serving him as a young soldier.

One medieval Welsh document names Illtud, in his knightly days, as one of the triumvirate (the others were named Cadoc and Peredur) to whom King Arthur gave custody of the Holy Grail. On this basis, some scholars have tried to identify Knight Illtud with Sir Galahad.
