= Llantwit Major =

Town in Wales

Llantwit Major: Welsh: Llanilltud Fawr
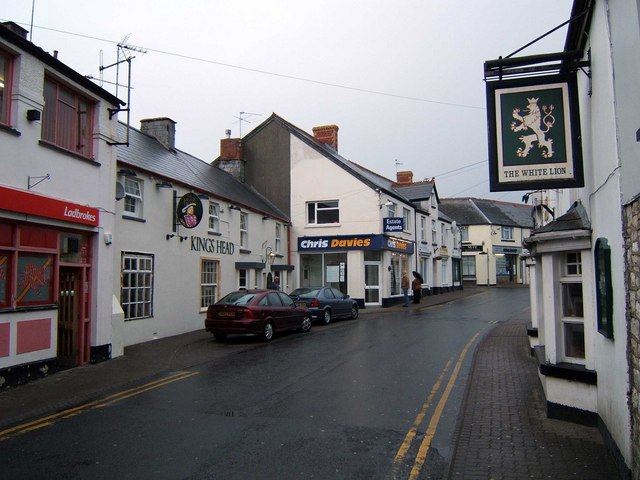
- East Street

- Location within the Vale of Glamorgan
- Population: 9,486 (2011)
- OS grid reference: SS975685
- Community: Llantwit Major
- Principal area: Vale of Glamorgan
- Preserved county: South Glamorgan
- Country: Wales
- Sovereign state: United Kingdom
- Post town: LLANTWIT MAJOR
- Postcode district: CF61
- Dialling code: 01446
- Police: South Wales
- Fire: South Wales
- Ambulance: Welsh
- UK Parliament: Vale of Glamorgan
- Senedd Cymru – Welsh Parliament: Pen-y-bont Bro Morgannwg
- List of places UK Wales Vale of Glamorgan 51.40623°N 3.47503°W Community map: Map of the community

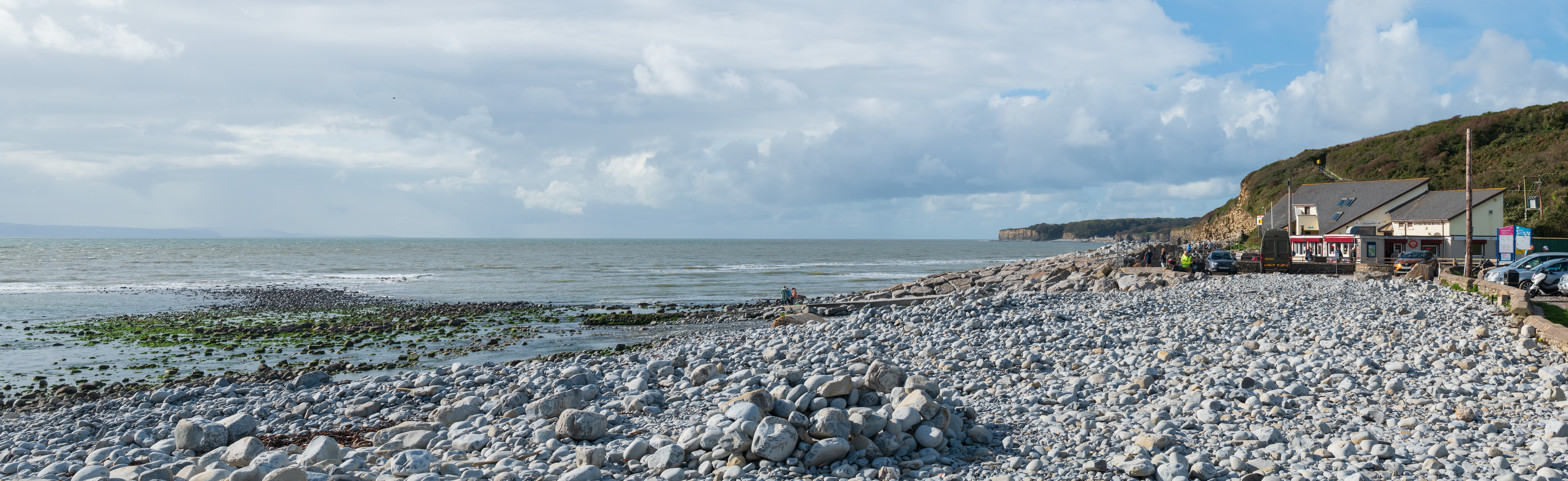
Llantwit Major beach

Llantwit Major (Welsh: Llanilltud Fawr) is a town and community in Wales on the Bristol Channel coast. It is one of four towns in the Vale of Glamorgan, with the third largest population (13,366 in 2001) after Barry and Penarth, and ahead of Cowbridge. It is 4 1/2 miles (7.2 km) from Cowbridge, 9 miles (14 km) from Bridgend, 10 miles (16 km) from Barry, and 15 miles (24 km) from Cardiff. It had a population of 9,530 in 2021.

Llanilltud Fawr, named for the Llan (land) of Saint Illtud, was home to the Monastery of Illtud and the college known as Bangor Illtyd. It became one of the most esteemed centres of Christian culture in the Celtic world. At its peak it had over 2,000 students, including princes, eminent clergymen, and revered saints. The institutions were destroyed by the raiding Vikings in 987, but Normans rebuilt the monastery in 1111 and it continued to be a centre of learning until it was disbanded in 1539 during the dissolution of the monasteries. The 13th-century St Illtyd's Church, near the ancient monastery, is a Grade I listed building and one of Wales's oldest parish churches.

In the 20th century, the modern town developed rapidly to accommodate Royal Air Force personnel from the St Athan base. Remnants of the medieval cobbled streets can be seen adjacent to the 12th-century Old Swan Inn, and numerous buildings of the 15th and 16th centuries remain.

Colhugh Beach is a popular surfing venue and has the remnants of an Iron Age fort and some of Wales' finest examples of Jurassic fossils. The pebble beach and its clifftops are protected as part of the Glamorgan Heritage Coast, which stretches for 14 miles (23 km) from Gileston to the east to Southerndown and Newton Point to the west.

== Toponymy ==
The parish church glosses the Welsh name of the town rather literally as "Illtud's Great Church". However, the name used in English means "Greater". The epithet fawr distinguishes this Llantwit from Llantwit Fardre (Llanilltud Faerdref) near Pontypridd and Llantwit Minor (Llanilltud Fach; also known as Llantwit-juxta-Neath and Lower Llantwit) near Neath. The Welsh place-name element llan referred to the sanctified community around an early Christian settlement in Wales and its parish, rather than merely the church itself (eglwys).

== History ==
=== Prehistory ===
Llantwit Major has been inhabited for over 3,000 years: archaeological evidence has shown that it was occupied in Neolithic times. The remains of an Iron Age fort are in its beach area.

=== Roman villa ===
The Roman villa at Caermead (51.4192°N 3.4989°W) remains as faint earthworks in a field, near the 13th-century parish church of St Illtud. The L-shaped courtyard villa was discovered in 1888. Records from 1893 suggest that one room was used as a praetorium, another as a workshop; and there was a 5th-century adjoining sacristy, simple in style, which featured a chancel, nave, and stone altar. Found remains included brachycephalic and dolichocephalic skulls, as well as horse bones. Fine mosaic floors are a notable feature of the villa. The tesserae included blue and crystalline limestone, green volcanic stones, brown sandstone, and red-brick cuttings, encircled with a red, white, blue and brown border. A record from 1907 described the relics as Samian ware pieces; bronze coins of Maximinus Thrax, Victorinus, and Constantius Chlorus; as well as roofing materials.

The site was again excavated between 1938 and 1948. It may have been first settled in the 1st century, but the first stone structure was not erected until a hundred years later. The site developed slowly and, it has been suggested, was even abandoned for a while during the 3rd century. By the 4th century, there was an L-shaped villa with a large, aisled building possibly for farm workers, and a number of smaller agricultural structures almost enclosing a central courtyard. The Royal Commission on the Ancient and Historical Monuments of Wales has associated collection records of the site, including drawings of other remains such as statues and a tessellated pavement, as well as documentation of a 1971 excavation. An early-medieval-period cemetery is in evidence, as are earthworks, traces of walling, a bank and a ditch. Pieces of pottery have been found.

=== Côr Tewdws ===
According to the 18th-century historian of ill-repute, Iolo Morganwg, the Côr Tewdws or 'College of Theodosius' was established in the late 4th century at a place at or near Llantwit Major called Caer Worgorn by co-founders Emperor Theodosius and Custennin Fendigaid, but was later burnt to the ground by Irish pirates and abandoned. Morganwg's works have since been discredited.

=== Saint Illtud's College ===
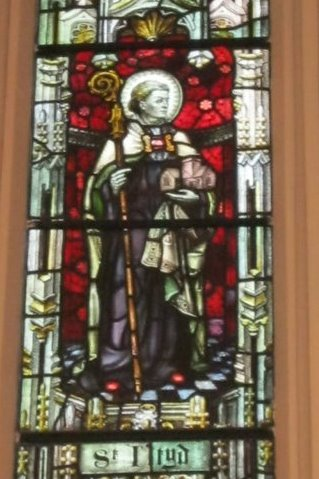
Saint Illtud, who gives his name to the town

Germanus of Auxerre and Lupus of Troyes made at least one visit to Britain in AD 429 and founded or refounded a number of ecclesiastic establishments across South Wales. It was at this time that Saint Illtud came to the Hodnant valley. Although he is said to have been born in Brittany, Illtud had fought as a soldier in Wales before renouncing his former life at the behest of Saint Cadoc. What is certain is that Illtud oversaw the growth of a pioneering monastery and associated college called Bangor Illtyd, on the Ogney Brook, close to the current St Illtyd's Church. Together these institutions became the first great hub of Celtic Christianity and teaching.

Under Illtud and his successors, Bangor Illtyd and the monastery grew in reputation both as the origin of many prominent Celtic evangelists and as a major centre of scholarly education. As such, it began to attract scholars from across the Celtic and wider world. The college itself was said to be the oldest in the world, consisting of seven halls, 400 houses and more than 2,000 students at its peak, including seven sons of British princes, and scholars such as St. Patrick, St. Paul Aurelian, the bard Taliesin, Gildas the historian, Samson of Dol, and St. David are believed to have spent some time there. Samson was known to have been summoned by Dyfrig to join the monastery in 521 and he was briefly elected abbot before leaving for Cornwall. King Hywel ap Rhys (d. 886) was buried at the monastery.

=== Norman and early modern eras ===
The college suffered during the invasions of the Saxons and the Danes, and was destroyed by the Vikings in 987 and again by the Normans in the late 11th century. In 1111 it is documented as being restored, but likely in a lesser state than the original. It is known to have continued to function as a monastic school until the 16th-century Reformation. The ruins of the original school house are located in a garden on the northern end of the churchyard and the monastic halls were located in a place called Hill-head on the north side of the tithe-barn. Although nothing of the original monastery remains, the present church was originally built between 950 and 1400 and its earliest existing secular buildings date from the 15th century. The church and school became the property of Tewkesbury Abbey around 1130 after becoming part of the Norman kingdom of Glamorgan.

After the dissolution of the monasteries by Henry VIII during the Reformation, it became independent from Tewkesbury in 1539. St Donat's Castle, 1 1/2 miles (2.4 km) to the west, was built in the 13th century.

=== Modern era ===
In the 20th century, Llantwit developed into a dormitory town and grew about 15 times in size to accommodate the Royal Air Force at St Athan. Despite its modernization and rapid growth, it retains its pre-modern feel with its narrow winding streets, high walls, old town hall and gatehouse, and several inns and houses dated to the 16th century. Llantwit Major railway station on the Vale of Glamorgan Line was reopened in June 2005. In 2014, it was rated one of the most attractive postcode areas to live in Wales.

== Geography ==
Llantwit Major is located in southeast Wales and mid-west along the coast of the Vale of Glamorgan. The town can be accessed from the north directly by the B4268 road and indirectly by the B4270 road (St. Athan road) which branches from the A48 road, and directly by the B4265 road which leads to Bridgend in the northwest and Cardiff Airport and Barry in the east. It is one of four towns in the Vale of Glamorgan with the third largest population after Barry and Penarth, and ahead of Cowbridge, which is about 4 1/2 miles (7.2 km) to the northeast. Llantwit Major is about 9 miles (14 km) from Bridgend, 10 miles from Barry and about 15 miles (24 km) from Cardiff. Boverton is an eastern suburb of Llantwit.

The River Ogney, runs through the town and joins the streams [Hoddnant and Boverton Brook] which flow in from Eglwys Brewis in the northeast; these then merge and become the Afon Colhuw, which meanders down the Colhuw meadows before discharging through an outfall into the sea. The Llantwit Major area is built on a range of different levels and the town itself is sloping. At the lower coastal level is the flat, glacial Colhugh Valley, marked by steep cliffs on both sides, leading to a pebble beach. The beach, located to the south of the town (51.396667°N 3.500833°W), has the remains of an ancient old stone wall from the large Iron Age hill fort, Castle Ditches. The steep cliffs at Llantwit which allow walks along the coast to St Donat's Castle and Atlantic College have undergone dramatic erosion in recent years: in many places, the rock structure has collapsed in piles, particularly on the eastern face.

The cliff path, once set about 100 yards (90 m) from the edge is now within metres of the nature pathway, and the Vale of Glamorgan Council has installed extensive new barriers to prevent fatalities. The 14 miles (23 km) of coastline from Gileston in the east to Newton Point in the west, passing through St Donat's and Southerndown, is protected as part of the Glamorgan Heritage Coast. Tresilian Bay is between Llantwit Major and St Donat's. Along this stretch of coast the cliff path winds through numerous valleys. Llantwit Major beach has one of the finest sites in Wales for Jurassic fossils, including corals, giant brachiopods, gastropods and the bones of Ichthyosaurus.

The beach is popular with summer tourists, and has a campsite on the nearby fields. The beach has a snack bar and restaurant and associated amenities to cater for the increased public demand in recent years. There is an expansive rocky beach at low tide, with a stretch of sand towards the far west, and views of the Bristol Channel and the coastline of Somerset, with the landmark white roof of Butlins, Minehead.

=== Climate ===
Climate data for St Athan (1991–2020 normals)
Month	Jan	Feb	Mar	Apr	May	Jun	Jul	Aug	Sep	Oct	Nov	Dec	Year
Record high °C (°F)	14.5 (58.1)	16.8 (62.2)	20.0 (68.0)	24.7 (76.5)	30.5 (86.9)	34.6 (94.3)	32.9 (91.2)	33.5 (92.3)	28.8 (83.8)	26.3 (79.3)	18.0 (64.4)	16.7 (62.1)	34.6 (94.3)
Mean daily maximum °C (°F)	8.2 (46.8)	8.4 (47.1)	10.2 (50.4)	12.9 (55.2)	15.9 (60.6)	18.5 (65.3)	20.2 (68.4)	20.0 (68.0)	18.1 (64.6)	14.7 (58.5)	11.2 (52.2)	8.7 (47.7)	13.9 (57.0)
Daily mean °C (°F)	5.7 (42.3)	5.7 (42.3)	7.2 (45.0)	9.4 (48.9)	12.2 (54.0)	15.0 (59.0)	16.8 (62.2)	16.7 (62.1)	14.8 (58.6)	11.8 (53.2)	8.6 (47.5)	6.2 (43.2)	10.9 (51.6)
Mean daily minimum °C (°F)	3.1 (37.6)	3.0 (37.4)	4.2 (39.6)	5.8 (42.4)	8.6 (47.5)	11.5 (52.7)	13.4 (56.1)	13.5 (56.3)	11.5 (52.7)	9.0 (48.2)	5.9 (42.6)	3.7 (38.7)	7.8 (46.0)
Record low °C (°F)	−8.5 (16.7)	−6.3 (20.7)	−5.8 (21.6)	−2.7 (27.1)	1.5 (34.7)	4.9 (40.8)	6.6 (43.9)	6.4 (43.5)	3.7 (38.7)	−1.7 (28.9)	−8.4 (16.9)	−9.6 (14.7)	−9.6 (14.7)
Average precipitation mm (inches)	100.5 (3.96)	76.3 (3.00)	70.7 (2.78)	63.0 (2.48)	64.1 (2.52)	66.2 (2.61)	80.6 (3.17)	97.7 (3.85)	81.5 (3.21)	112.8 (4.44)	111.1 (4.37)	118.8 (4.68)	1,043.2 (41.07)
Average precipitation days (≥ 1.0 mm)	15.2	12.1	11.9	10.8	10.6	10.1	11.2	13.2	11.7	15.1	15.9	15.7	153.4
Mean monthly sunshine hours	56.0	85.0	128.0	181.8	226.3	217.1	220.2	189.8	160.5	108.8	66.3	52.1	1,691.8
Source 1: Met Office
Source 2: Starlings Roost Weather

== Economy ==
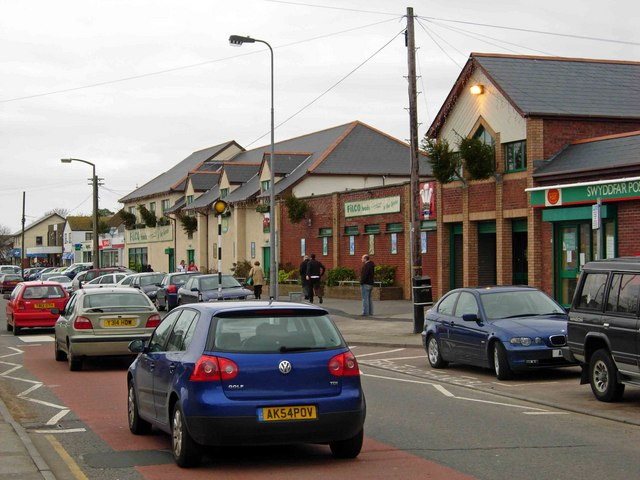
Boverton Road

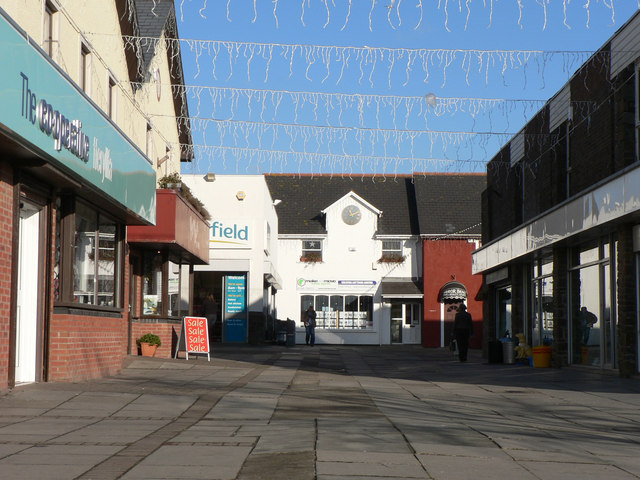
The Precinct

Llantwit Major is a small town which is largely dependent on local retail and earnings from further afield. The majority of the inhabitants commute to work elsewhere, especially Cardiff or Bridgend. During the summer months tourism is important to the town which has "The Precinct", Rainbow Plaza and several pubs and restaurants. Of note are the Old Swan Inn, Old White Hart Inn, The Tudor Tavern, and the 17th century West House Country Hotel Heritage Restaurant.

Llantwit Major railway station on the Vale of Glamorgan Line reopened in June 2005. Passenger services are operated by Transport for Wales as part of the Valleys & Cardiff Local Routes network.

Although it is much less known than Porthcawl further down the coast, Llantwit Major has considerable renown in South Wales as a surfing location. The beach has a lifeguard station funded by the Vale of Glamorgan Council, built in the late 1990s, functioning during the summer months. There is a beach cafe and often organised walks.

The Victorian Fair Day, established in 1983, is usually held in June on the Saturday nearest to the 22nd of the month, with a Victorian theme which attracts people from across southern Wales. The town has several supermarkets including Co-op Food and Filco, and a town library. The local artistic community supports a number of arts and crafts shops, some selling locally made pottery and other ceramics.

== Governance ==
A Llantwit Major electoral ward exists, covering Llantwit Major community but also stretching west to St. Donats. The total population of this ward at the 2011 census was 10,621. Since 2008 the ward has been represented by councillors from the local interest party, Llantwit First Independents.

The town is governed by the Llantwit Major town council consisting of fifteen councillors. There are fifteen independent councillors. At the May 2017 elections Llantwit First Independents won 12 of the seats. Councillor Mrs Jayne Norman was elected Mayor of Llantwit Major Town Council on 11 May 2017. Llantwit Major also comes under the administration of the Vale of Glamorgan unitary authority. Llantwit Major is twinned with Le Pouliguen, France.

== Notable landmarks ==
=== Listed buildings ===
Listed buildings in Llantwit Major and Boverton

The following are the listed buildings in Llantwit Major and Boverton. The listings are graded:

- Parish Church of St. Illtud (I)
- Churchyard cross, Church Street (II)
- Churchyard walls and gates to St. Illtud's Church, Burial Lane (II)
- Mid well, Bakers Lane (II)
- Circular walls and steps at West End Pond (II)
- Batslays Farmhouse (II)
- Boverton Park House (previously Boverton Place Farmhouse) (II)
- Boverton Place (II)*
- 'The Causeway' (previously No. 4. The Causeway and "Navron") (II)
- 'Navron' (previously No. 4. The Causeway and "Navron") (II)
- Walls surrounding garden to west of Boverton House (previously doorway and walls of garden to west of Boverton House) (II)
- Boverton House and attached stable block (II)
- Garden walls and railings of Boverton House (II)
- Wall and gateway opposite Boverton House (II)
- Cherry Tree Cottage (previously Nos. 1 and 2, Boverton Court Farm or Boverton Court Cottage) (II)
- Tudor cottage (previously Nos. 1 and 2, Boverton Court Farm or Boverton Court Cottage) (II)
- Orchard House (II)
- The Town Hall (previously the Old Town Hall) (II*)
- Former chantry/priest's house, Burial Lane (II)
- Chantry house, Hillhead (II)
- Old Place or Llantwit Major Castle (II)
- Forecourt wall of Old Place (II)
- Old Plas Cottage, West Street (II)
- Well opposite Downcross Farm, West Street (II)
- Downcross Farmhouse, including front garden wall (previously Downcross Farm, West Street) (II)
- Footbridge over stream, west entrance to St. Illtud's Churchyard, Church of St. Illtud (II)
- The gatehouse, Church Lane, (former porter's room) (II*)
- Dovecote, Church Lane (II*)
- The Old Swan Inn public house (II*)
- Tudor Tavern public house (II)
- 1 Church Street (previously Nos. 1 and 1A, Church Street) (II)
- Quaintways with attached garden wall (previously Ty Ny and southern wing of Quaintways, Colhugh Street) (II)
- Ty Ny with attached garden wall (previously Ty Ny and southern wing of Quaintways, Colhugh Street) (II)
- To-Hesg (previously Ty Hesg) Colhugh Street (II)
- Old Rosedew House (previously Rosedew, Colhugh Street) (II)
- Rosedew, Colhugh St (II)
- Bethel Baptist Church, Commercial Street (II)
- The Old House, Court Close (previously House to north-east of Pear Tree Cottage, High Street) (II)
- Plymouth House, Plymouth Street (previously Plymouth House (including mounting block)) (II)
- Garden Wall, gate, mounting block, and stables at Plymouth House (II)
- Lodge to Dimlands, Dimlands Road (II)
- Tyle House (II)
- Bethesda’r Fro Chapel with attached mounting block, Eglwys Brewis Road (II)
- Forecourt and graveyard gates, gatepiers and walls of Bethesda’r Fro Chapel, Eglwys Brewis Road (II)
- Malta House, 1 Flanders Road (II)
- 2 Flanders Road (II)
- The Cottage with attached garden walls, 4 Flanders Road (previously Nos. 3 and 4, Flanders Road) (II)
- Flanders Farmhouse, Flanders Road (II)
- Garden wall and gate of Flanders Road (II)
- Lower House (previously Lower House Farm) Flanders Road (II)
- Great Frampton (II)
- Barn and stable range at Great Frampton Farmhouse (II)
- Court House, High Street (II)
- Sunny Bank, with attached garden walls, High Street (II)
- Outhouse at Sunnybank (II)
- Ty Mawr or Great House, High Street (II*)
- The Old Police Station, Hillhead (II)
- Little Frampton Farmhouse (II)
- Brooklands Cottage, Methodist Lane (II)
- Summerhouse Fort, Summerhouse Camp (II)
- Summerhouse Tower, Summerhouse Camp (II)
- Fonmon Cottage (previously Fonmon House) Station Road (II)
- War Memorial, (Formerly base of war memorial), The Square (II)
- Telephone call-box, outside Old White Hart public house (II)
- Pear Tree Cottage with attached wall and mounting block (previously Corner House and Pear Tree Cottage [including mounting block], Turkey Street) (II)
- Corner House (previously Corner House and Pear Tree Cottage (including mounting block), Turkey Street) (II)
- Rewley Court (previously Rawley Court), Turkey Street (II)
- West Farm, West Street, (previously West Farmhouse and garden walls) (II)
- Front Garden Wall to West Farm (II)
- Walls to [detached] garden to West Farm on south-east side of West Street (II)
- Hill Cottage, West Street (II)
- Swimbridge Farmhouse, with attached garden walls, Westhill Street (II)
- The Swine Bridge, Westhill Street (II)
- Downs Farmhouse, Wick Road (II)
- Circular pigsty, Downs Farm, Wick Road (II)
- Windmill House (previously Frampton Windmill) Windmill Lane (II)
- Old White Hart Inn public house, Wine Street (II)
- The Old School, including attached walling, Wine Street (previously The Old Rectory, former presbytery and Llanilltud Fawr County Junior School)
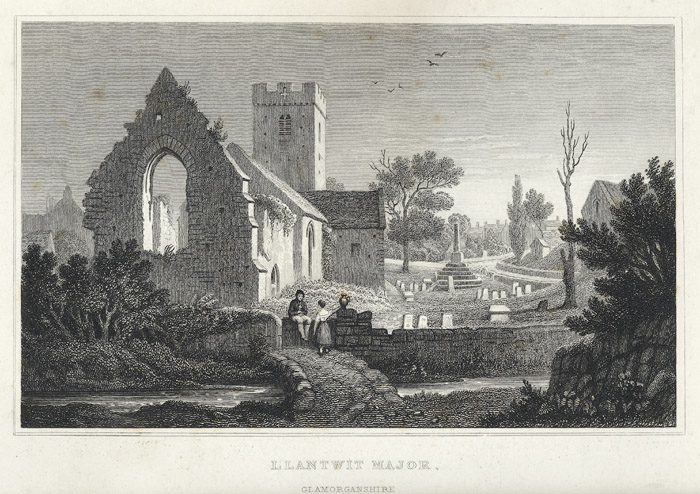
Engraving ca. 1835

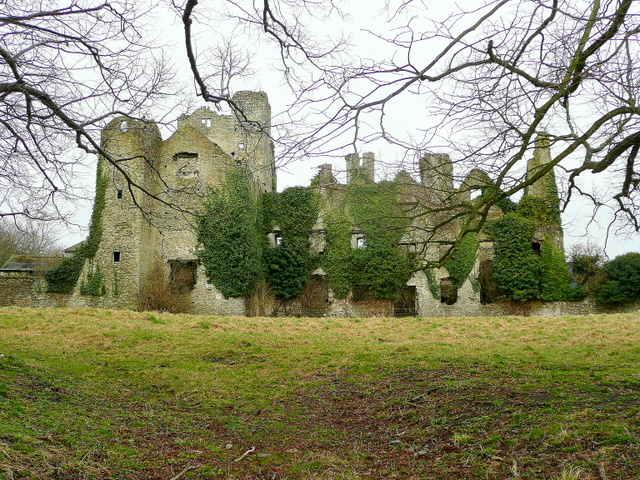
Boverton Place

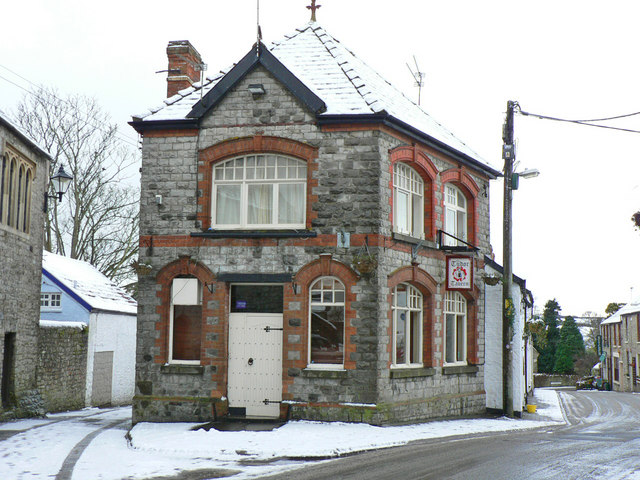
The Tudor Tavern

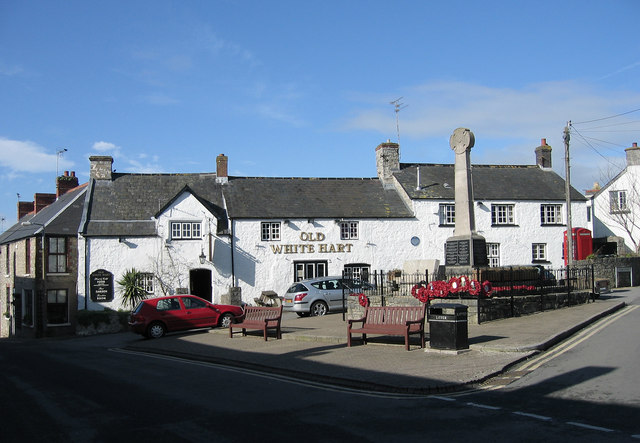
Old White Hart Inn

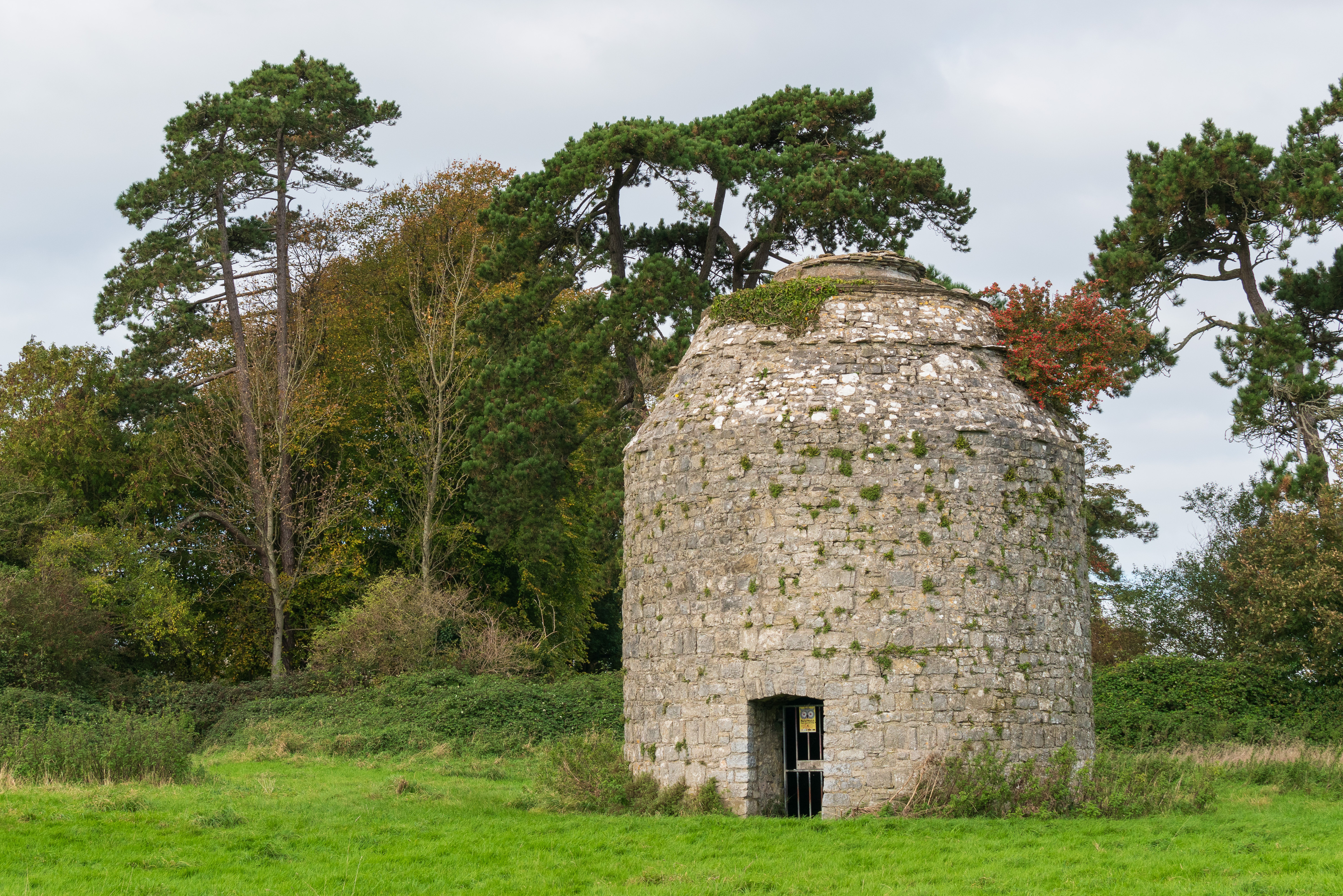
Dovecote, Church Lane

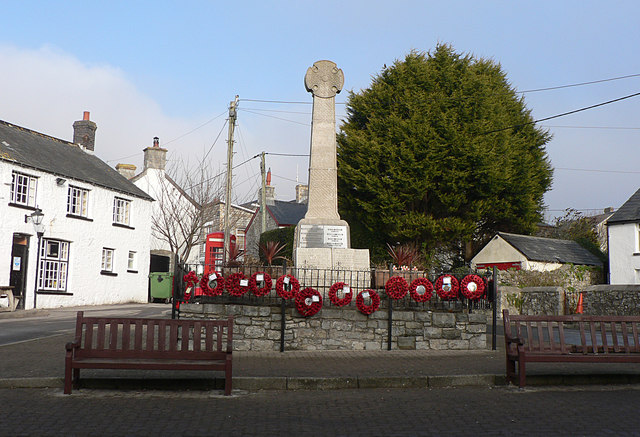
War memorial

==== St Illtyd's Church and monastery ====
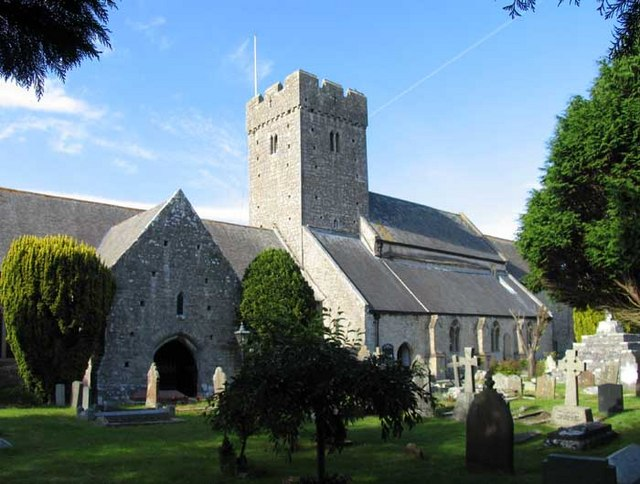
The Church of St Illtyd, Llantwit Major

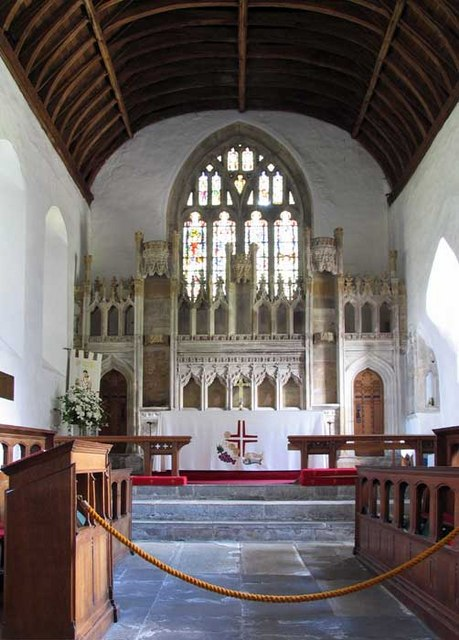
Interior of the church

The foundation of St. Illtyd's Church dates back to the Age of the Saints in early Welsh Christianity and thus by its very existence provides evidence of continuity with sub-Roman Christianity. The town grew up around the Bangor Illtyd ("Illtyd's college"). Saint David, Saint Samson, Saint Paul Aurelian, Saint Gildas, Saint Tudwal, Saint Baglan and king Maelgwn Gwynedd are said to have studied at the divinity school. It was founded around AD 508 by St Illtyd as a centre of learning. The school is said to have stood on the north side of the churchyard; and the monastery was situated north of the tithe barn on Hill Head.

The elongated church (51.4081°N 3.4878°W), a conglomeration of distinct buildings, is divided into two areas by a wall, a 13th-century monastery church, and the Norman parish church. The eastern section contains interesting medieval wall paintings with religious themes, and a fine reredos. The western section, a Lady chapel, 40.5 feet (12.3 m) in length, contains a small museum housing the Llanilltud Collection of Celtic Stones, including a pillar and two inscribed stones of major importance. One commemorates King Rhys ab Arthfael of Morgannwg who died in the mid-9th century. The church contains a curfew bell and medieval priest effigies. The older church is 64 feet (20 m) long; the newer church was built by Richard Neville. The grounds also include a 13th-century gatehouse, a monks' pigeon-house, ruined walls in a garden area, and mounds near the vicarage.

==== Town Hall ====
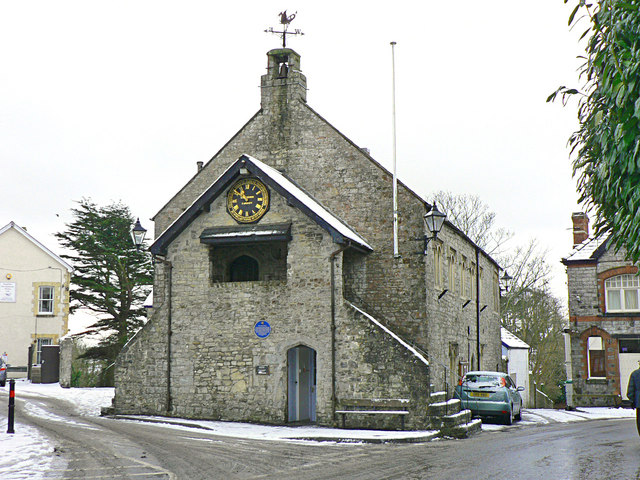
Llantwit Major Town Hall

Manorial records indicate that the Town Hall (51.4076°N 3.4848°W) dates to the 15th century but it is often attributed to Gilbert de Clare, Lord of Glamorgan, who died much earlier in 1295. It then functioned as a manor and a meeting venue for the court to organise duties and collect rents and at weekends held fairs. It was renovated in the late 16th century and over the years the lower floor functioned as a school, a slaughterhouse and a jail and the top floor a venue for church meetings, leased to Oddfellows in the 1830s. Aside from fairs it also held plays, concerts and dances. It became a Grade: II* listed building on 22 February 1963. It features a bell with the inscription, Sancte Iltute, ora pro nobis ("Saint Illtyd, pray for us"). It is reached by a flight of steps.

==== Great House ====
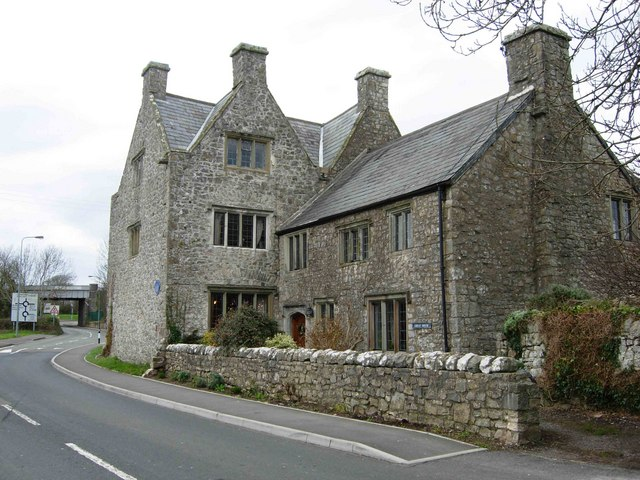
The Great House

The Great House (51.412361°N 3.488173°W), located along the road to Cowbridge, on the northern outskirts originally dated from the 14th century when it consisted of just a square central section, but significant additions have made it an excellent example of a Tudor "Ty mawr" (Great House). A northern wing with a stable and dovecot were amongst the added parts. The house was occupied by the Nicholl family for centuries but by the 1920s it had been abandoned and fell into a heavily dilapidated state. The building was bought and restored to its former glory in the 1950s.

==== Dove cote and gatehouse ====
Covered by a domical vault, the Dove Cote (51.406414°N 3.48913°W) is a Grade II* listed tall 13th-century cylindrical column in a middle of the Hill Head field, which lies in close proximity to St Illtuds Church, next to the site of the old tithe barn, built for the monks at the St. Illtud's monastery. Another site on Hill Head is the (13th–14th century) gatehouse, now belonging to St Illtyd's Church, Llantwit Major. Today these are the only remaining buildings which at one time belonged to Tewkesbury Abbey. There is a plaque on the gatehouse, telling of its history.

==== The Old Place ====
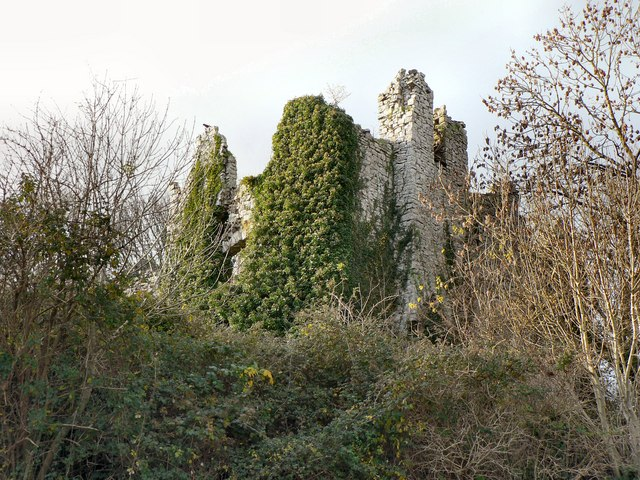
"The Old Place"

The Old Place (51.407665°N 3.489745°W) is a ruin of an Elizabethan manor house, built by Griffith Williams for his daughter and son-in-law Edmund Vann in 1596. It is often mistakenly called Llantwit Castle. The Williams family were successful lawyers and part of the rising minor gentry who were loathed by the Seys of Boverton and the Stradlings of St Donats. Vann was fined over £1,000 for being involved in a scuffle in central Llantwit on a Sunday which led him to take on the Sey family and seek his revenge.

==== Old Swan Inn ====
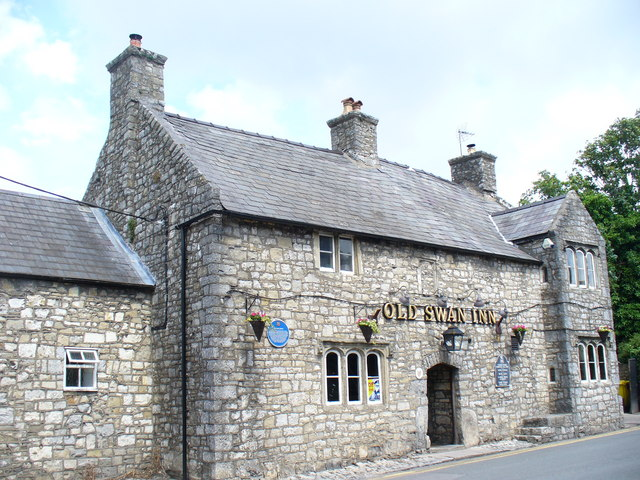
The Old Swan Inn

Records state that a building was located here from the 11th century and during medieval times it is believed to have been a monastic or manorial mint. but the current Grade II* listed inn (51.408341°N 3.486029°W) is dated to the 16th century, aside from restoration work; it was once thatched roofed. It was run for many years in Tudor times by the Raglan family. In the mid 17th century there is evidence that its owner Edward Craddock was again using it as a mint to "mint his own tokens as there was a shortage of coin at this time." There are five other pubs and four restaurants in the town.

==== The Old White Hart Inn ====
The Old White Hart Inn is Grade II listed, and described as a late 16th-century building. It has been suspected that the building was previously used as a courthouse, but this has never been proved. Moreover, tokens were given out under the Old White Hart's name in the 18th century.

==== Plymouth House ====
According to the blue plaque on the wall outside Plymouth House (51.408791°N 3.488876°W), the house is believed to have been formerly part of the monastery, perhaps functioning as a halled house for some time in the fifteenth century. After its closure in 1539, it became the manor house of West Llantwit owned by Edward Stradling. Later owners include Lewis of the Van, the Earl of Plymouth and then Dr. J. W. Nicholl Carne, who renamed it after its previous owner some time in the 19th century.

==== Court House ====
From the blue plaque on the Court House (51.409519°N 3.485348°W), it was formerly known as Ivy house when it was a town house from the 16th century. In the 18th century it was extended by Christopher Bassett. For some time it was owned by the Throckmorton family of Coughton Court, Warwickshire, descendants of one of the perpetrators of the Gunpowder Plot. Later owners included Daniel Durrell, headmaster of Cowbridge Grammar School, and the benefactor of Tabernacle Chapel, Elias Bassett. It then fell to his niece and her husband William Thomas and became part of the Thomas family and at one time was owned by Illtyd Thomas, father of Mare Treveleyan, an antiquarian. The Thomases built the Town Hall clock to commemorate Queen Victoria.

==== Knolles Place ====
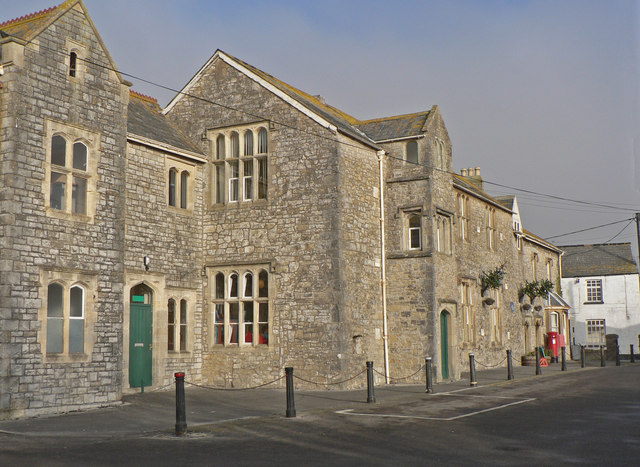
The Old School

According to the blue plaque on the building (also known as "The Old School") (51.408413°N 3.487469°W), it was built around 1450 by John Raglan (Herbert) and was then owned by Robert Raglan, from a family who had significant power in the area at the time and held many local administrative posts as stewards and priests. In the 17th century it became a vicarage for Stephen Slugg and functioned as a boarding school for primary school children between 1874 and 1975.

==== Old police station ====
The old police station (51.4069°N 3.4872°W) was built in the mid-1840s after the place is Glamorgan Constabulary was established in 1841, and originally comprised a single-storey building, but was expanded in 1876 to include four bedrooms on the top floor. It continued to function as a police station until 1928 when a new building opened nearer the town centre on Wesley Street.

==== War memorial ====
This is located in the centre of Llantwit War Memorial (51.40842°N 3.486894°W), between the Old Swan and the White Hart and has a Celtic cross. The memorial commemorates residents who lost their lives or went missing in World War I and World War II. There are 32 names listed for World War I and 26 names for World War II.

==== Bethel Baptist Church ====
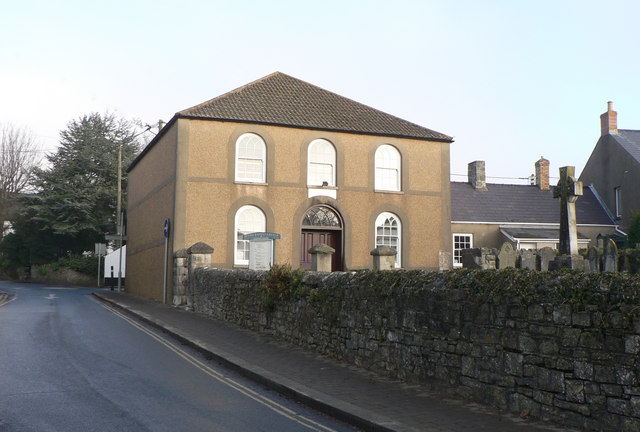
Bethel Baptist Church

Bethel Baptist Church (51.408714°N 3.485035°W) was erected in 1830 to provide for local Baptists and its first minister was a local shopkeeper named Jabez Lawrence. Christmas Evans, a one-eyed Welsh preacher of considerable renown was reported to have held services here.

==== Boverton Place ====
Located in Boverton, Boverton Place (51.404751°N 3.464059°W) is a former fortified manor house, now in ruins. It was built at the end of the 16th century and served as the seat of Roger Seys, Queen's Attorney to the Council of Wales and the Marches in the 1590s. It remained in Seys family until the last heiress Jane Seys married Robert Jones of Fonmon who sold it to owners who let it fall into ruin. Its last occupants were mentioned in the census of 1861.

==== Dimlands ====
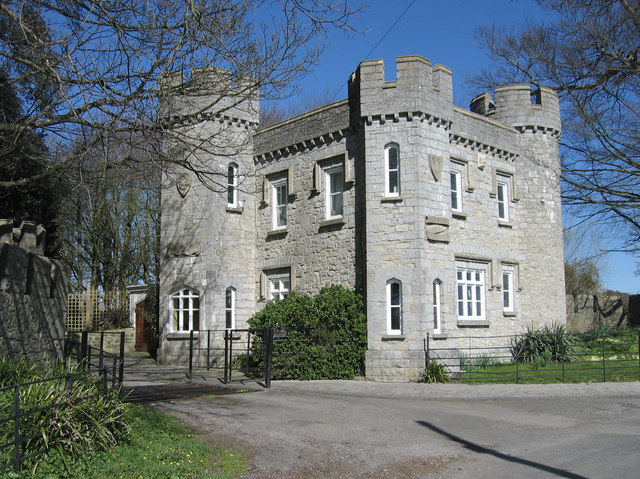
Dimlands Lodge

Dimlands (or Dimland Castle or Dimland Lodge) (51.406172°N 3.501055°W) is situated about a kilometre back from the clifftops of the Bristol Channel along the road to St. Donats. It was owned at one time by John Whitlock Nicholl Carne of the University of Oxford who moved there after his father's death. Dimlands was built by John Carne's father, Rev. Robert Carne, at the end of the 18th century, upon land left him by his father, Whitlock Nicholl of The Ham, sheriff for the county of Glamorgan in 1746. The property was held by the Nicholl family since the time of King Henry VII. The dwelling is of castellated Tudor architecture with blue lias limestone exterior, and Coombedown stone windows and cornices. The south-facing front is more than 130 feet (40 m) in length. The western coast of Cornwall and Lundy Island are visible from the turrets. The carved chimney in the dining room is made of Caen stone, and the chimney-piece in the drawing room is also. Other features are the Minton tile flooring, the large Tudor-style staircase, two sitting rooms, and the library, a newer addition. The Dimlands stables feature sharp-pointed gables, as well as a carved stone with the date of the original grant (1336).

=== Hillhead ===
On the hillside of the Colhugh Valley there are a row of houses situated at Hillhead in Llantwit Major. The houses were built in the early years of the 19th century for the poor of the parish. With the introduction of the Poor Law Amendment Act 1834, a workhouse was opened in Bridgend. The houses became surplus to requirements and were then sold as private residences. Llantwit Major came under the Bridgend and Cowbridge Poor Law Union. Each unit was originally divided into two separate upper and lower accommodation, the upstairs entrance was from the west and the entrance to the lower accommodation came from the east.

== Education and sport ==
Llantwit Major Leisure Centre

The town is home to Llantwit Major A.F.C., a football club playing in the Cymru South. The club won Division Three in 2016/17, and Division Two in 2017/18. Sam Snaith and Adam Roscrow have gone on to play in the Welsh Premier League and English Football League respectively.

Llanilltud Fawr Comprehensive School is the secondary school in the town. A fire gutted the building in October 1991 and a new building was constructed. The school has roughly 1300 pupils and around 85 full-time staff. Immediately adjacent is Llanilltud Fawr primary school, one of four primary schools in Llantwit, the others being Eagleswell primary school, Ysgol Dewi Sant and St. Illtyd's primary school.

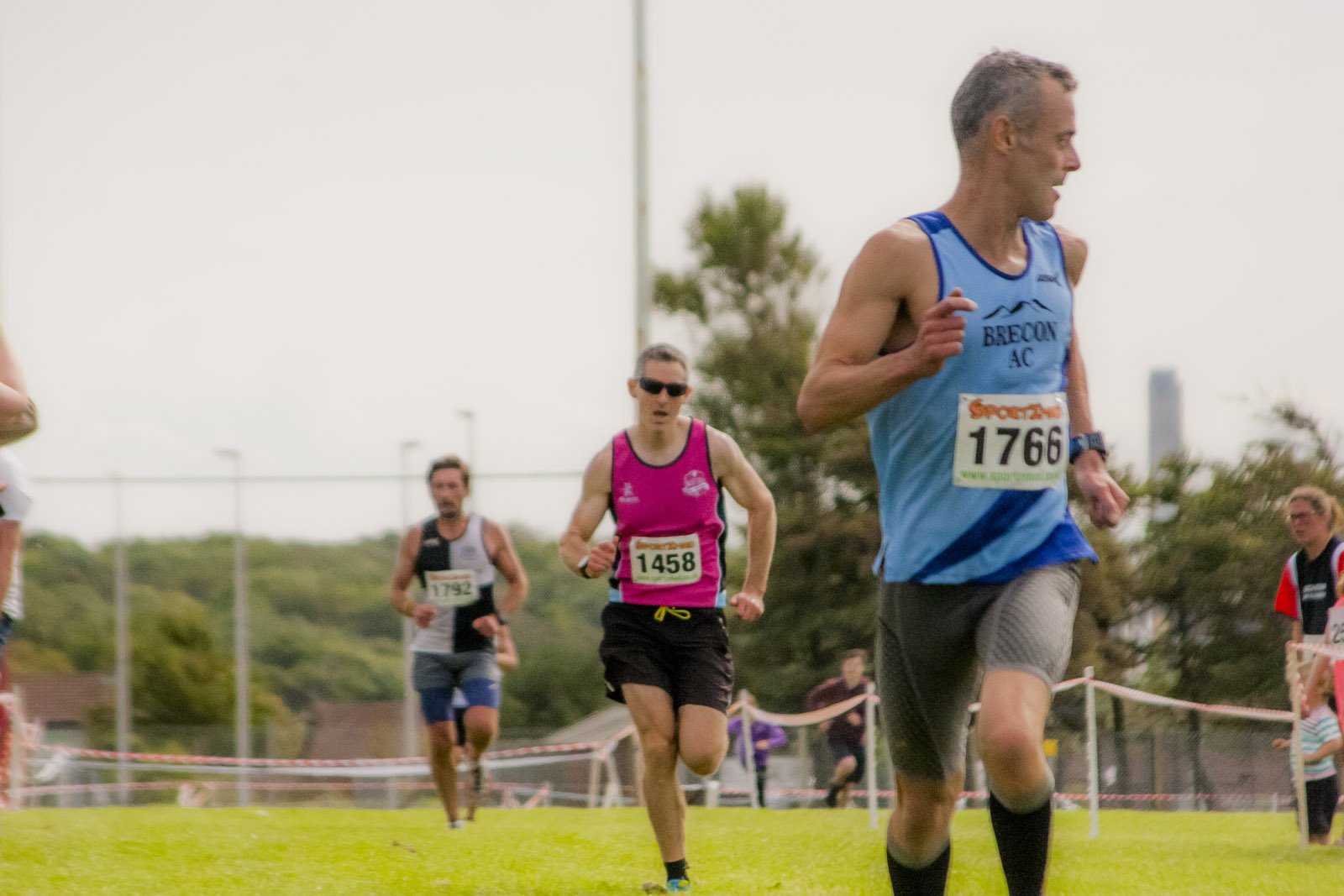
Runners competing in the Llantwit Major 10K

Facilities at the Llantwit Major leisure centre include a small swimming pool, large and small sports halls, the LifeStyle Fitness Studio, sunbed facilities, conference room and bar. The Llantwit Major Rugby Football Club, which played its first match against Cowbridge Rugby Football Club in 1889, fields two senior, one youth (U/19) and eight mini/junior teams, and plays in Division Four of the Welsh Rugby Union leagues. Other sports clubs represent association football, cricket and running.

== Cultural references ==
The town is fictionally portrayed in the late Glyn Daniel's novel Welcome Death (1954). Some areas of the town have been used in the recording of the recent series of Doctor Who and The Sarah Jane Adventures episode The Temptation of Sarah Jane Smith (created by BBC Wales). The local tearooms were used in the 2007 making of Y Pris filmed by and shown on S4C.

== Notable people ==
- Glyn Daniel (1914–1986) scientist and archaeologist
- Dafydd Hewitt (1985–) Former Cardiff Rugby Rugby Player
- Daniel Hopkin (1886–1951) Labour MP born in Llantwit Major
- Steve Grapes (1953–) Former Professional Footballer for Norwich City and Cardiff City
- Karl Jones (1957–) racing driver
- Pat Mountain (1976–) goalkeeping coach for Bristol City F.C., grew up in Llantwit Major
- Josh Navidi (1990–) former Cardiff Rugby, Wales, British and Irish Lions International Rugby Union Player
- Theophilus Redwood (1806–1892) pharmacist, one of the founding members of the Royal Pharmaceutical Society of Great Britain
- Adam Roscrow (1995–) Welsh Professional Footballer for The New Saints currently on loan at Welling United
