= Aberthaw =

Coordinates: 51.3910°N 3.3885°W

Aberthaw: Welsh: Aberddawan
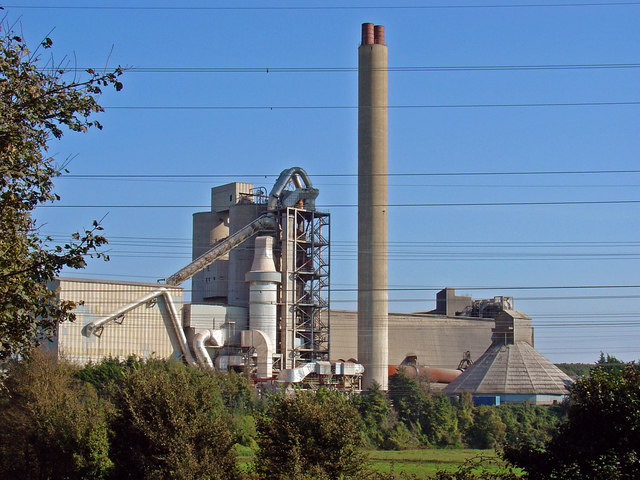
- Aberthaw Cement Works

- Location within the Vale of Glamorgan
- OS grid reference: ST034667
- Community: St Athan; Rhoose
- Principal area: Vale of Glamorgan
- Preserved county: South Glamorgan
- Country: Wales
- Sovereign state: United Kingdom
- Post town: Barry
- Postcode district: CF62
- Police: South Wales
- Fire: South Wales
- Ambulance: Welsh
- UK Parliament: Vale of Glamorgan
- Senedd Cymru – Welsh Parliament: Vale of Glamorgan

Aberthaw (Welsh: Aberddawan) is an area containing the villages of East Aberthaw and West Aberthaw, on the coast of South Wales about 5 miles (8 km) west of Barry. It is the location of Aberthaw Cement Works, Aberthaw Lime Works, and Aberthaw Power Station, a decommissioned coal power station that was linked to the South Wales Valleys via the Vale of Glamorgan Railway. The area is historically within the parish of Penmark in the Vale of Glamorgan. The two villages of West and East Aberthaw are separated by the River Thaw. The village of East Aberthaw, near Rhoose, has a 13th-century pub. The village Baptist Chapel and Mission Room no longer exist as such and have been converted for other uses.

== Geography ==
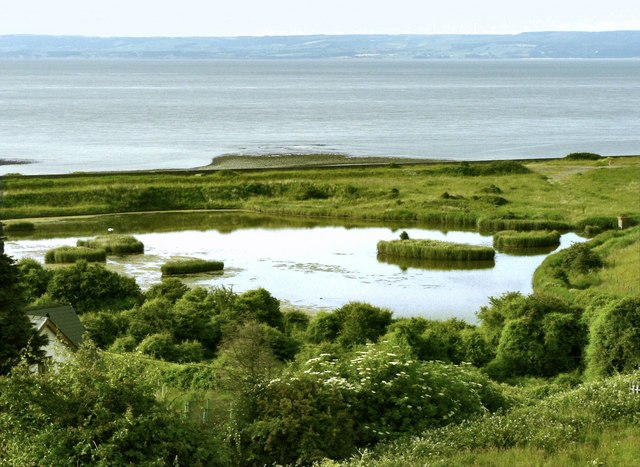
Lagoon on The Leys of East Aberthaw

Aberthaw is nearly opposite Minehead in Somerset, England. The village of East Aberthaw is situated approximately 0.25 miles (0.40 km) inland from the sea. The River Thaw, which meets the sea at Aberthaw, is fairly small and is affected by high tides at times, and with the coming of the first coal-fired power station at Aberthaw circa 1958, was diverted to form a straight channel about 959 yards long from the fixed coastline and this section is therefore within the Power Generation Board's property. Its former tributary now forms an enclosed pond area near the old lime works and is rich in wildlife. From Dunraven to Aberthaw, the coastal cliffs feature blue and brown argillaceous limestones, shales, and marls. As far as East Aberthaw, the cliffs are under 100 feet (30 m), and in some places not more than 50 feet (15 m). For a short distance east of Pleasant Harbour in East Aberthaw, there are wooded cliffs about 300 yards from the high-water mark of ordinary tides. West of the port of Aberthaw there is an expanse of alluvial ground protected by embankments. This is bordered by hillocks of blown sand, and these rise about 20 feet (6.1 m) above the shingle beach. Bordering the blown sand, there is a ridge of thick shingle, and beyond this, between tide-marks, is an expanse of shingle on mud. There are no cliffs to the west of Aberthaw until Summerhouse Point. Font-y-Gary Cave is near Aberthaw.

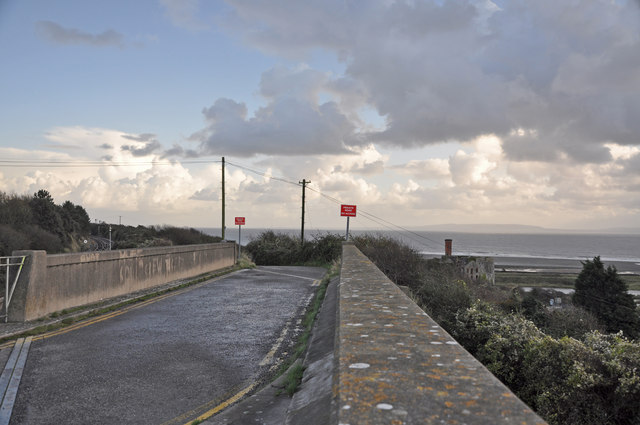
Lane above The Leys, East Aberthaw

The beach in front of the power station, The Leys, is near Gileston and West Aberthaw; it is well known for its sea fishing. The East Aberthaw Coast Conservation Area covers the whole of the East Aberthaw village and contains a lagoon on The Leys. Breaksea Point, at the edge of Limpert Bay at Aberthaw, is sometimes regarded as the southernmost point of Wales, although this is contested with Rhoose Point; nevertheless, the Vale of Glamorgan Council has decreed that Rhoose Point is the most southerly and has placed a notice board to that effect on the coastal footpath at Rhoose Point.

== History ==
=== Ancient to medieval times ===
Aberthaw derives its name from the Welsh word 'aber', meaning estuary or river mouth, of the river Thaw. The existence of a safe, natural harbour provided an early impetus for the area's development and trade. There were settlements in the second and third centuries, substantiated by Roman pottery, shells and tiles that were discovered when a new pipeline was laid through East Aberthaw in the 1950s. Excavations in Well Road revealed the foundations of walls which may have belonged to the Roman settlement, while further discoveries of coins, jewellery, tiles and Samian ware pottery suggested that the nearby bay served as a landing point or port during the Roman invasion. The Shrunken Village at West Aberthaw, considered an Ancient Monument in Glamorgan, consisted of a shrunken hamlet within a narrow strip of St. Athan parish which extended to the Bristol Channel.

A small village centred around the intersection of two roads had developed by the medieval period. To the east, what is now Port Road led towards Fonmon and Penmark, whilst to the west, the present Well Road (previously known as Marshe Way) led towards the marshland and a ford across the estuary. The road leading north- south connected the coast with the settlements inland, and as Aberthaw trade flourished, the roads were used for moving imported goods to the markets at St. Athan and Cowbridge.

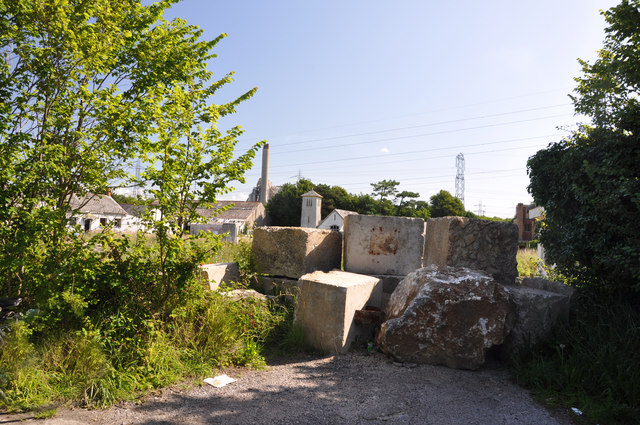
West Aberthaw, looking over at Boys Village

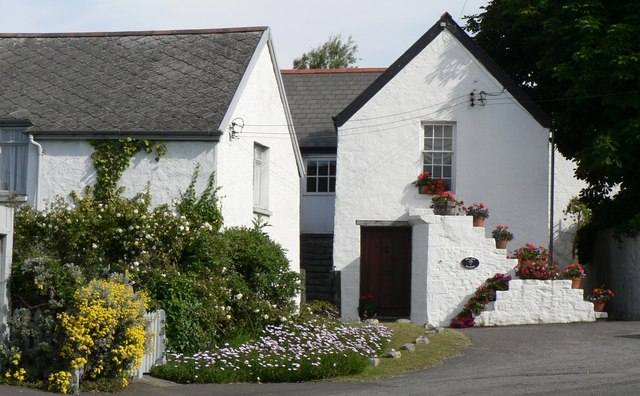
Whitewashed cottages, East Aberthaw

Of the buildings grouped around the crossroads, the original fabric of Lower Farm House and the once- thatched Rose Cottage and Marsh Cottages can all be dated to the medieval era. The Blue Anchor Inn is likewise of medieval origin, and appears to have been erected in 1380. The village, which came within the parish of Penmark, is also known to have included a small chapel which was possibly located towards the south of the settlement, as suggested by the marking of 'Chapplefeld' on the Evans Mouse map of 1622. This was to serve as a place of worship until being converted to a house at the turn of the 17th century.

=== 1500–1800 ===
In the 16th century, the Aberthaw port, situated to the southeast of the village proper, had emerged as a small but thriving harbour. The ships took wool and foodstuffs from Wales and returned with wine, salt, dried fruit and leather from the towns of northern France. Aberthaw port's importance was furthered by the loss of Porthkerry harbour to a 1584 storm, rendering Aberthaw the principal calling-point within South Wales between Cardiff and Swansea.

By the first half of the 17th century, boats were departing for not only England and France, but also Spain and Ireland. A similarly flourishing trade with the West Indies, chiefly in sugar and tobacco, did not, however, survive the disruption caused by the outbreak of the English Civil War. Within the context of the village, the port played a significant role in the livelihoods of many residents in the 17th century, though not always in a legal manner: smuggling was rife within the Bristol Channel. Buildings such as the fortified Marsh House, built just to the west of the village in 1636, appear to have been used for storage of illegally imported goods, especially tobacco. During the reign of George II, the Master of Fonmon sent soldiers to Aberthaw to try and capture the ringleaders of the smuggling gang. Beyond the business of the harbour, agriculture was also of central importance to the settlement, the land to the east of the village, between East Aberthaw and Fonmon, being marked by windmills and orchards. To the west, the marsh lands were suitable for grazing.

One of the port's staples was shipping butter to the Port of Bristol. It was remarked that Glamorgan supplied Bristol with its butter in much the same way as Suffolk supplied London and the port at Aberthaw was central to this trade.

=== 1800–present ===
Aberthaw Lime Works

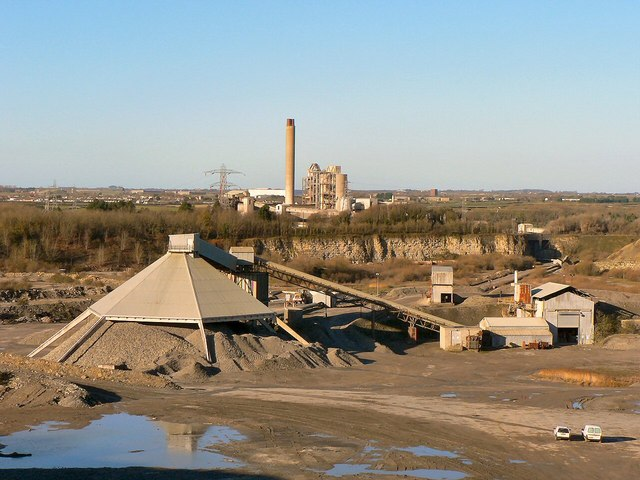
Rhoose Quarry and Aberthaw Cement Works

Aberthaw's maritime trade continued throughout the 18th century, but by the 1840s, its role as a port had declined, and the Topographical Dictionary of Wales (1849) stated that '[the harbour] is resorted to by a few coasting-vessels of inferior burthen'. In 1851, Aberthaw had a population of 495 people. The principal material then being exported, however, was the local lias limestone, called Aberthaw tarras, which was used to make hydraulic lime, which sets under water and was therefore very useful for building light houses (including the Eddystone Lighthouse) and canal locks. This limestone, considered to be of high quality, was to play a key role in the local economy during the ensuing years, beginning with the opening of Aberthaw Lime Works in January 1888. From December 1897, the area was served by the newly constructed Vale of Glamorgan Railway, and a second plant, the Aberthaw and Bristol Channel Portland Cement Works, began production to the north of the village in 1916. Today, the Vale of Glamorgan line remains open. This provides a link to the power station and cement works, and after being closed to passengers on 13 June 1964, was reopened to passenger traffic on 10 June 2005 but only with Rhoose (for Cardiff International Airport) and Llantwit Major stations rebuilt. The establishment of these industries close to Aberthaw was to result in an increased demand for residential accommodation, and by 1919, two new communities had been added at the northern and southern edges of the village. The community, by this time, had gained a Methodist Chapel and a Mission Room, the latter erected in an Arts and Crafts style on Station Road. Services such as a post office and village shop were also established.

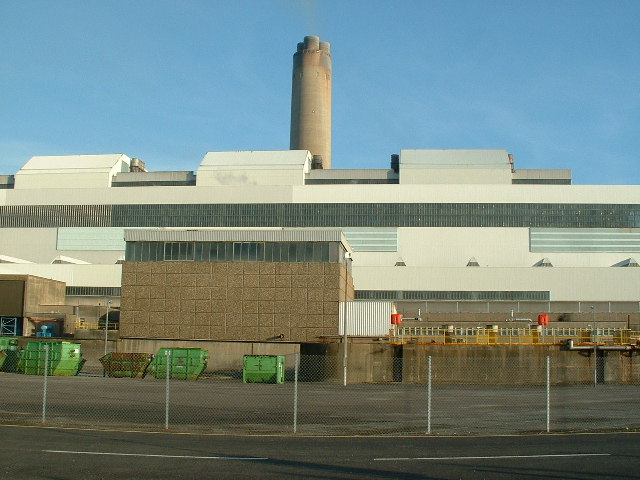
The Aberthaw Power Station uses locally sourced fuel.

In 1963, Aberthaw "A" Power Station officially opened, followed by the "B" station in 1971; construction had necessitated a local diversion of the River Thaw and the remnants of the old port diminished. Beyond the conversion of the former mission hall and a number of former agricultural buildings to residential use, East Aberthaw itself, however, has undergone little development. The "A" power station was demolished by July 1998 and the "B" station was closed on 13 December 2019, when decommissioning commenced.

== Landmarks ==
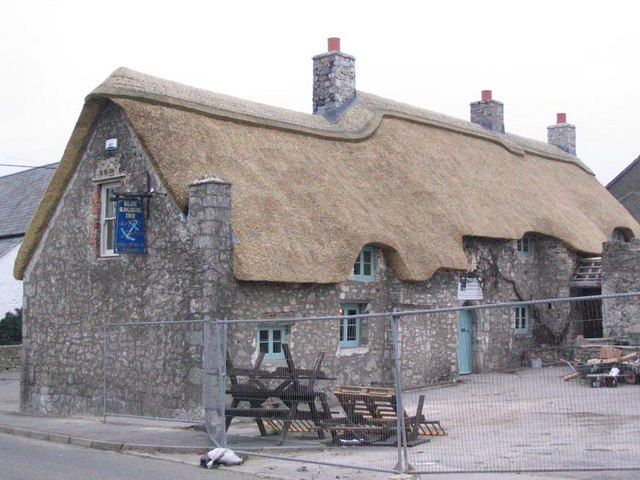
The Blue Anchor Inn

The principal building is the popular Grade II* listed Blue Anchor Inn, a long low building with walls and low timber beams dated to 1380, with a thatched roof. The inn was used as a tobacco drying shed during the smuggling days. The inn caught fire in 1922, 2004, and again in 2009, the last fire burning about 30% of the thatched roof.

Close by is the Grade II listed Marsh House, an 18th-century building with a symmetrical front and a slated catslide roof. The house was of major importance to local trade and smuggling operations, used as a storehouse, especially for tobacco. The Granary is a Grade II listed building dated to the early 19th century and includes stables, a hayloft and granary. The building is now used as a private residence. Also listed are 1 and 2 Marsh Cottage and The Haven. Several other unlisted cottages and houses are of note, such as Upper House Farm within the Conservation Area, and several converted barns. St Athan Boys' Village was a holiday camp in West Aberthaw, which operated from 1925 through 1991.

== Transport ==
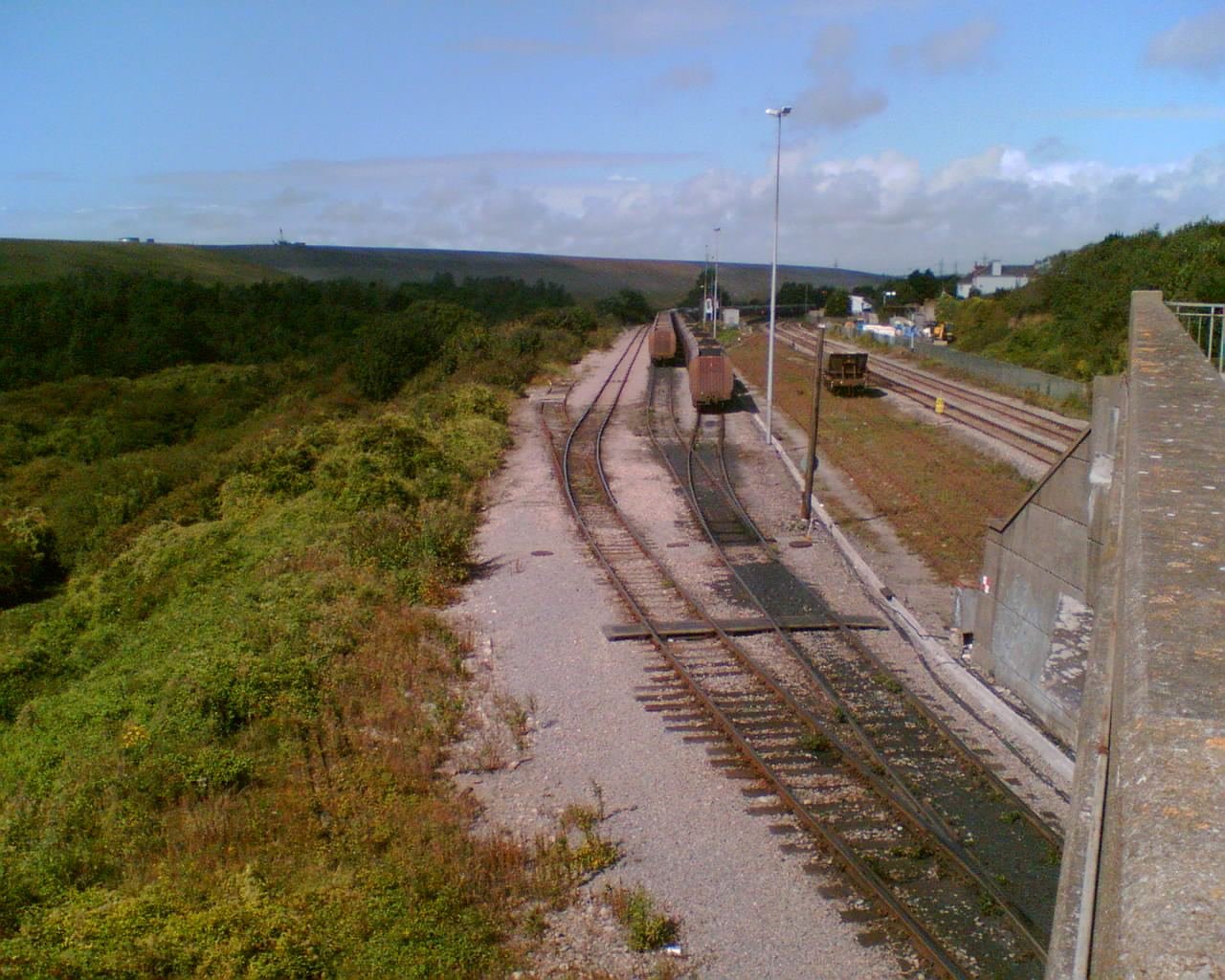
Aberthaw station. Overview as 66101 waits to enter Power Station

Aberthaw High Level was a four-track station on the Vale of Glamorgan Railway. There was no connection with the former single-line Taff Vale Railway's Aberthaw Low Level station on the defunct Cowbridge and Aberthaw railway. The latter, which also served the now Grade II-listed Aberthaw (Pebble) Lime works from 1892 until 1926 and ran from Llantrisant via Cowbridge, was lifted by June 1934.

The double-track Vale of Glamorgan line from Barry to Bridgend closed to passengers on 15 June 1964 but reopened to passengers on 10 June 2005, serving only Rhoose (for Cardiff Airport) and Llantwit Major. Aberthaw (High Level) station was permanently closed and its platform tracks lifted some years ago and in March 2013, Aberthaw signal box which controlled main line traffic and rail coal traffic access to Aberthaw power station(s) was taken out of use, and all remaining pointwork and signalling was transferred to the SWCC Vale of Glamorgan Workstation at Cardiff. When Aberthaw West signal box controlling the Aberthaw Cement Works exchange rail traffic closed in September 1980, Aberthaw East 'box was simply named 'Aberthaw'.

In December 2019, the remaining Aberthaw "B" power station was closed and was being decommissioned in 2020. Aberthaw signal box, being the only remaining example of its kind, is now devoid of all internal equipment and is a Grade II listed structure, but inaccessible to the public. It stands on the down platform of the demolished Aberthaw High Level station about 100m to the west of Station Terrace in East Aberthaw. Aberthaw Cement Works, a mile to the north is still rail-connected as at April 2020 and rail traffic to & from the works is controlled from a local, crew-controlled ground-frame which is interlocked with the SWCC Vale of Glamorgan Workstation remote signalling & points control.

The former Taff Vale Railway's Aberthaw Low Level station opened in 1892 to serve the village and had a connection to the limeworks at low level. With the closure of the low level station in 1931, the words 'High Level' were removed from Aberthaw's Vale of Glamorgan station. The up platform at Aberthaw now houses private dwellings and a further addition was being constructed in April 2020.

One kilometre to the north is the B4265 road which connects Barry to Bridgend, via Llantwit Major and St Brides Major. Cardiff Airport is 3 kilometres (1.9 mi) to the northeast. From the crossroads at the 14th-century Blue Anchor Inn, Well Road drops down a short steep hill to pass under an arched bridge carrying the double track Vale of Glamorgan line and extended in 1958 to carry new double tracks to Aberthaw "A" and "B" power stations. To the east from the crossroads, Port Road, a narrow lane, leads uphill to a farm group (Upper House Farm) and then passes over Aberthaw Cement Work's tunnel-connected extensive blue lias limestone quarries and on to some woodland at the hamlet of Fonmon, with alternative unclassified road access to Fontygary and Rhoose or to the B4265, passing Fonmon Castle.
