= Font-y-Gary =

Coordinates: 51.3853°N 3.3654°W

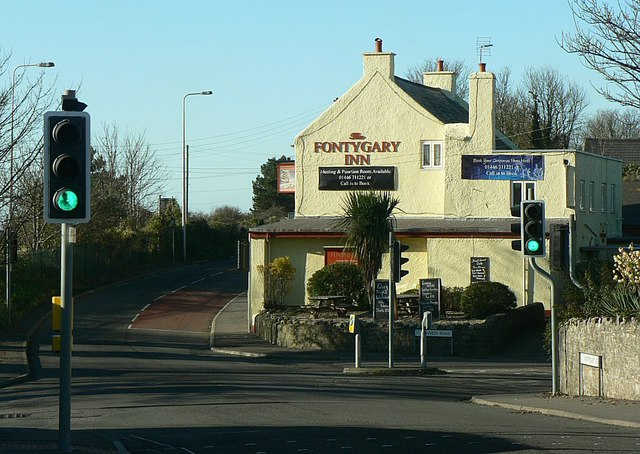
- The Fontygary Inn

- Location within the Vale of Glamorgan
- OS grid reference: ST051661
- Principal area: Vale of Glamorgan
- Preserved county: South Glamorgan
- Country: Wales
- Sovereign state: United Kingdom
- Postcode district: CF
- Police: South Wales
- Fire: South Wales
- Ambulance: Welsh
- UK Parliament: Vale of Glamorgan
- Senedd Cymru – Welsh Parliament: Vale of Glamorgan

Font-y-Gary, also Fontygary, Fontegary or Fontygari (Welsh: Ffont-y-gari), is a village adjacent to Rhoose, 3 miles (4.8 km) south-west of Barry in the Vale of Glamorgan, on the coast of South Wales. To the north is Fonmon and Fonmon Castle. The origin of the name is uncertain, but in 1587 it was documented as "Fundygary".

Font-y-Gary is located near Cardiff International Airport. There is little in the village itself apart from the Font-y-Gary Holiday and Leisure Park and caravan site and stoney beach. On Sundays there is a car boot sale on the holiday park site, as well as the club and shop. There is also a disused quarry in the vicinity between Font-y-Gary and Aberthaw.

In 1928 Font-y-Gary was noted for being a favorable picnic spot, and in 1943 Font-y-Gary was described as a "pleasant summer resort with a delightful beach for bathing, edged with rugged cliffs which form a delightful background – and a convenient undressing place for bathers." The shingle beach and cliffs are distinctive and there is a large cave called Font-y-Gary Cave. The scene is of the view from the top of the cliffs in the photos below. Actress Susan George frequently holidayed at the caravan park as a child.

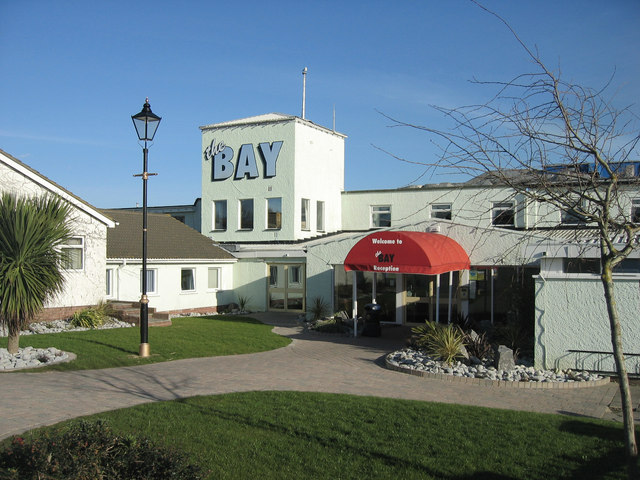
Font-y-Gary Holiday Home Park.

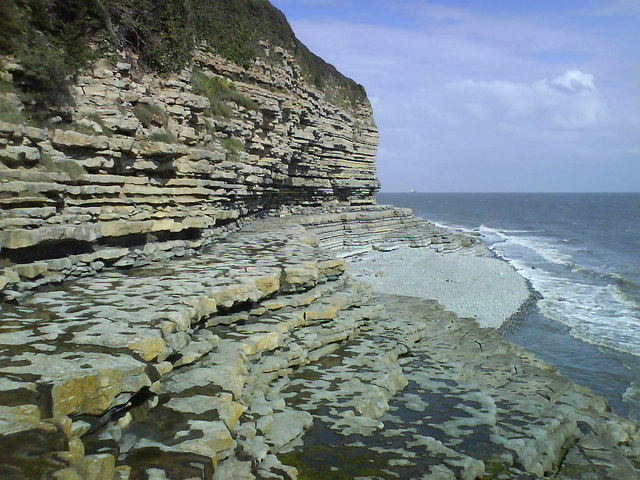
The coast at the Font-Y-Gary Beach looking east/southeast nearing high-tide.

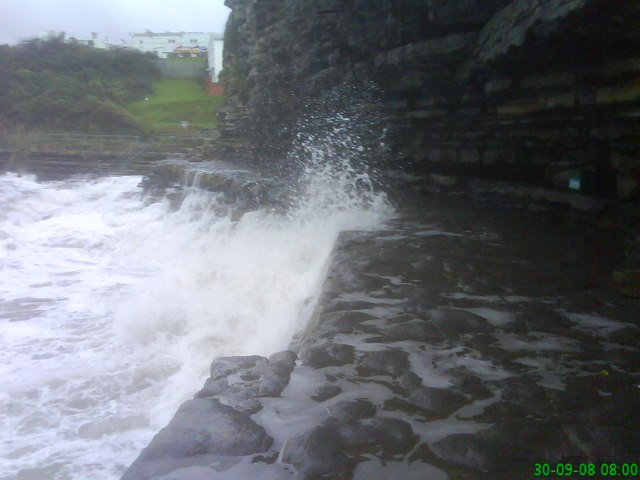
Font-Y-Gary beach looking west.

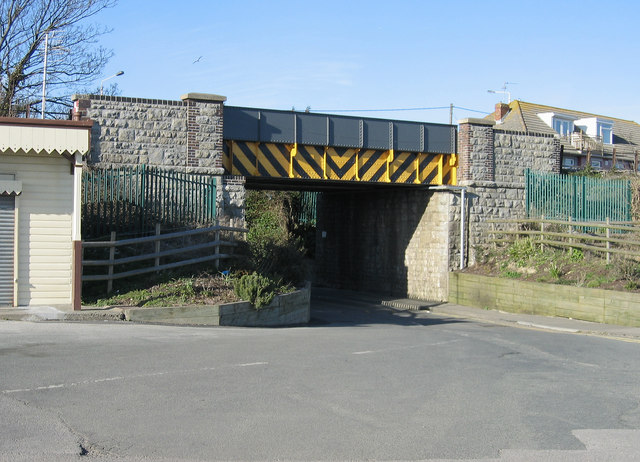
Railway Bridge at Font-y-Gary
