= Fonmon =

Coordinates: 51.399779°N 3.369596°W

Fonmon: Welsh: Ffwl-y-mwn
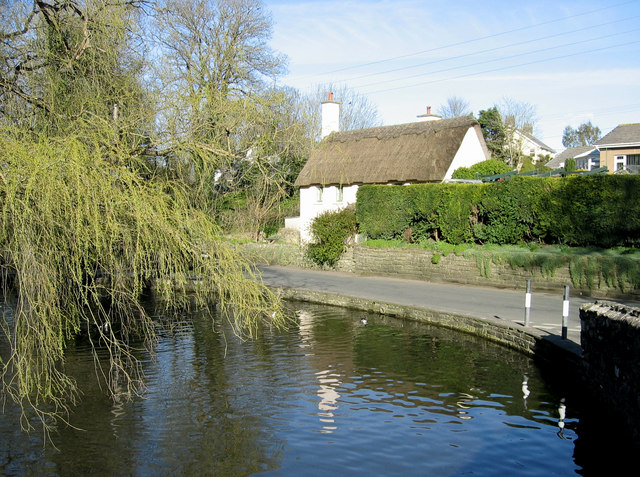
- Village pond, Fonmon

- Location within the Vale of Glamorgan
- Principal area: Vale of Glamorgan
- Preserved county: South Glamorgan
- Country: Wales
- Sovereign state: United Kingdom
- Postcode district: CF
- Police: South Wales
- Fire: South Wales
- Ambulance: Welsh
- UK Parliament: Vale of Glamorgan
- Senedd Cymru – Welsh Parliament: Vale of Glamorgan

Fonmon (Welsh: Ffwl-y-mwn) is a hamlet in the Vale of Glamorgan in south Wales. It lies just off the B4265 road to the northwest of Font-y-Gary and Rhoose on the western side of Cardiff Airport. The hamlet is best known for its central duck pond and Fonmon Castle, a historical house located on the otherside of the B4265 road to the north. The largest house in the hamlet is called The Gables, accessed off a drive on the left approaching Fonmon from the north. A number of the houses in the area are thatched roofed.

== Castle ==
Fonmon Castle is one of the few medieval castles which are still lived in as a home. Since it was built by the St. John family c.1200, it has only changed hands once. Oliver St John of Fonmon was one of the legendary Twelve Knights of Glamorgan who effected the Norman conquest of Glamorgan. The St John family is today represented by the Viscounts Bolingbroke. The castle is still in use as a private residence. The present owners, the Boothby baronets, are descendants of Colonel Philip Jones, who bought the house in 1654. In 1762 the castle was renovated by Thomas Paty of Bristol for its owner at the time, Robert Jones. The ceilings and library were designed by Thomas Stocking in the Rococo style and extensive gardens were added.

In 2022, archaeologists have discovered around 70 ancient graves on the grounds of Fonmon Castle, near the runway of Cardiff Airport. The graves are believed be dated to the 6th or 7th Century.

== Gallery ==
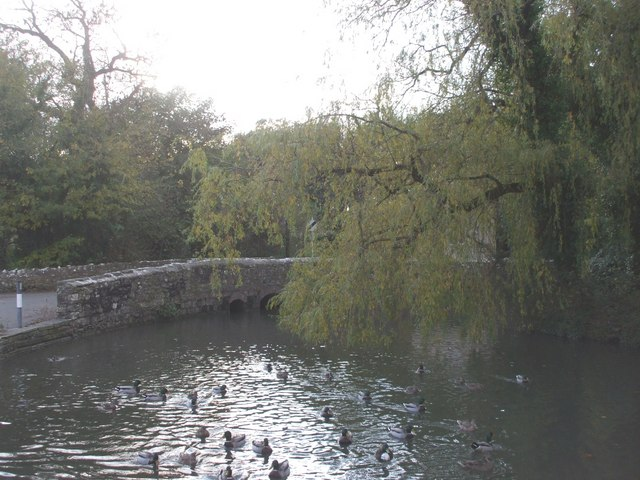
Duck pond

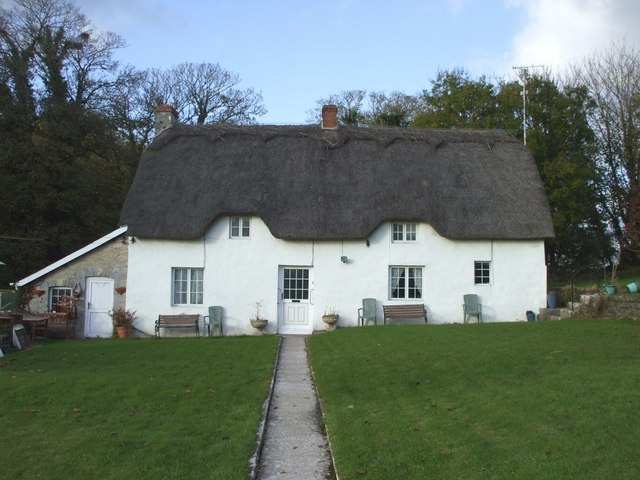
East Hall, Fonmon

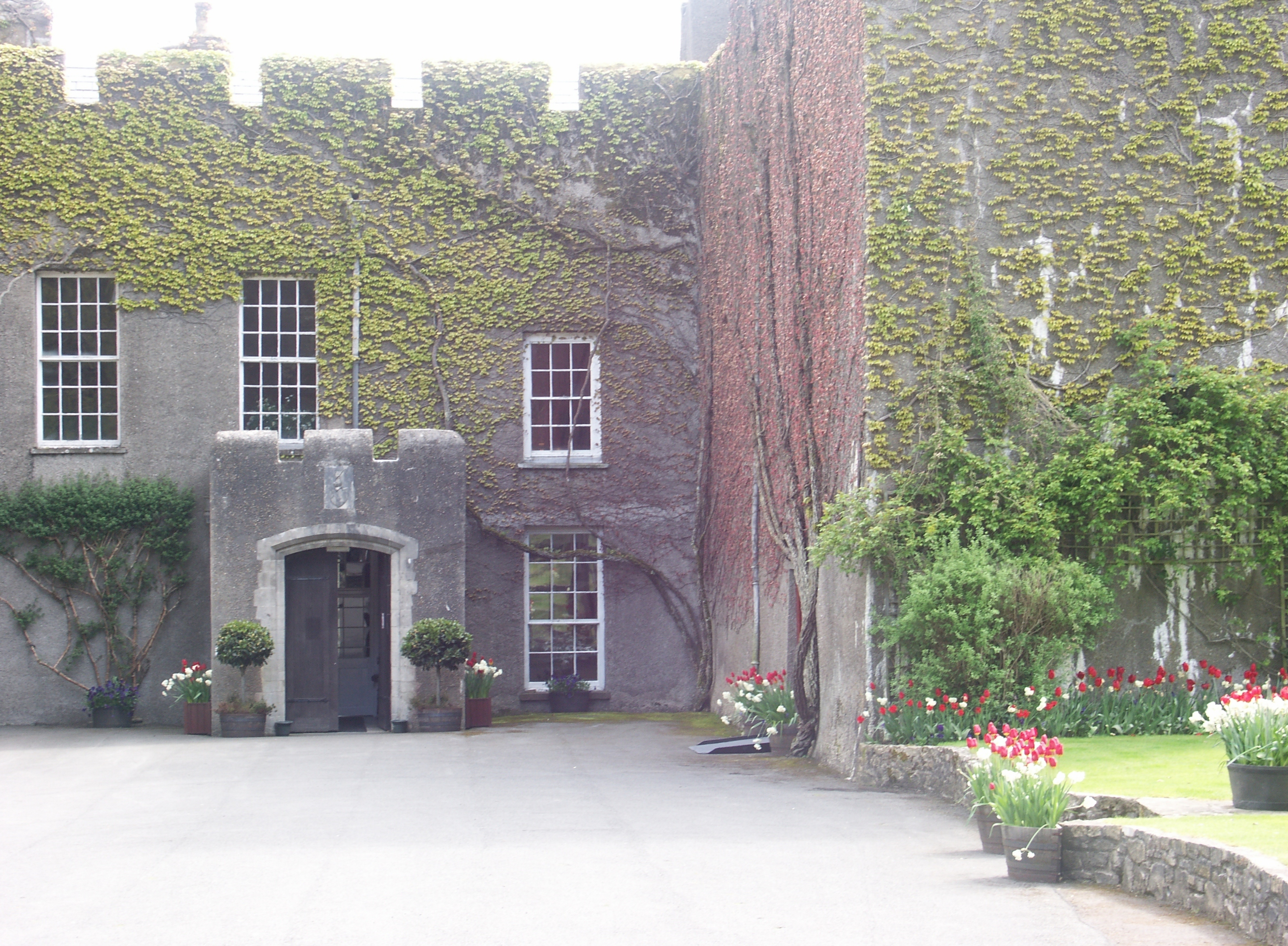
Fonmon Castle
