= Breaksea Point =

Promontory in Wales

Coordinates: 51.381°N 3.405°W

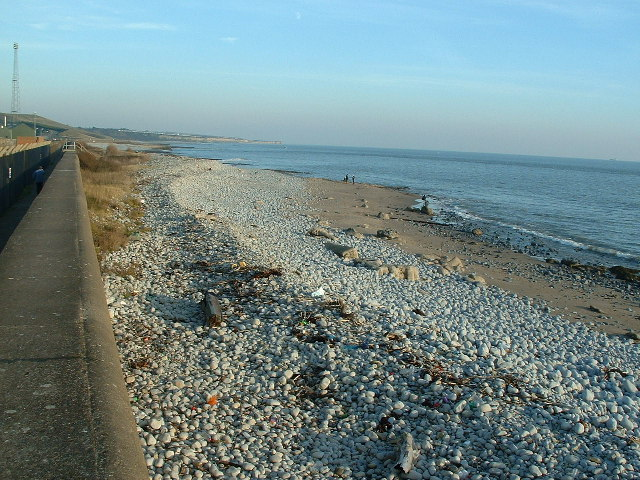
- View from Breaksea Point

- Location within the Vale of Glamorgan
- Principal area: Vale of Glamorgan
- Preserved county: South Glamorgan
- Country: Wales
- Sovereign state: United Kingdom
- Post town: Barry
- Postcode district: CF
- Dialling code: 01446
- Police: South Wales
- Fire: South Wales
- Ambulance: Welsh
- UK Parliament: Vale of Glamorgan
- Senedd Cymru – Welsh Parliament: Vale of Glamorgan

Breaksea Point is a promontory at the eastern edge of Gileston's Limpert Bay in the Vale of Glamorgan on the south coast of Wales. Breaksea Point is claimed as the southernmost point of mainland Wales, although that is also claimed of nearby Rhoose Point and the Vale of Glamorgan Council have placed a fixed notice to that effect. (Note: By latitude calculation, Rhoose point may be a few metres further south. However, Breaksea Point is fixed with the construction of a sea wall in 1958 in connection with sea defences for the establishment of Aberthaw "A" & "B" power stations, whilst Rhoose Point, 4.42km to the east, is suffering from cliff erosion which technically changes its northing.) Almost 20 km to the east, the Welsh island of Flat Holm is slightly further south in latitude.
