= Aberthaw Lime Works =

Derelict lime works in South Wales

Coordinates: 51.3859°N 3.3837°W

Aberthaw Lime Works

Aberthaw Lime Works, Rhoose, Wales, 2025

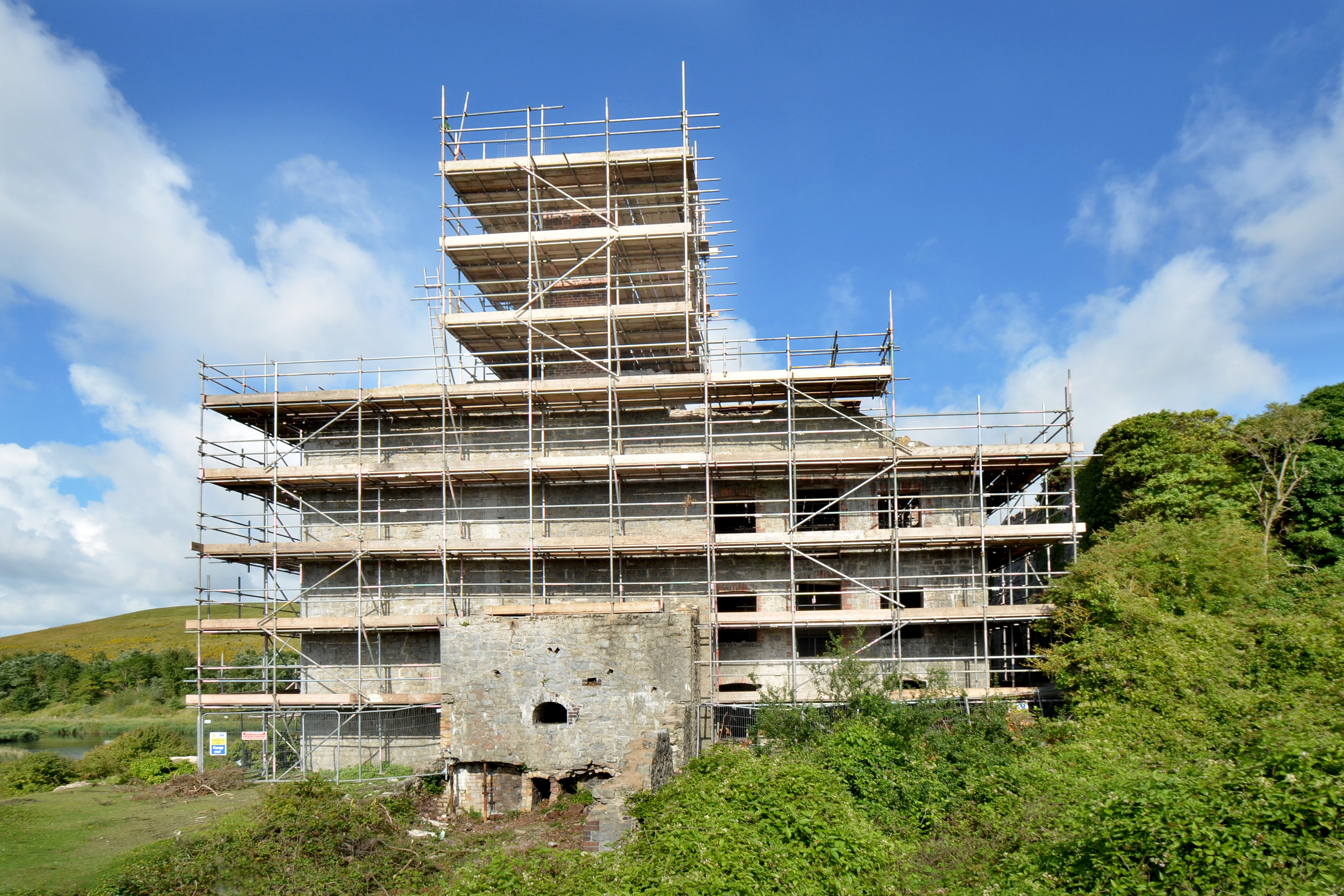
Aberthaw Lime Works under restoration

Aberthaw Lime Works is a derelict structure, located on the South Wales coast, between Fontygary Bay and Aberthaw Power Station. The structure is a Grade II Listed Building, on the grounds that it is a well-preserved structure from an important regional industry.

The Aberthaw Lime Works was opened on 22 December 1888, by the Aberthaw Pebble Limestone Company. It was built to utilise the huge number of limestone pebbles that had previously been taken inland or been moved by boat. The lime works operated until 1926. The lime works brought a new scale of working to the lime industry which was really just a cottage industry in the area previously.

The structure, built of local limestone and brick, is still largely intact, although it is missing most of its wooden components. It contains two vertical pot draw kilns each holding up to 300 tons each, which could produce up to 40 tons of burnt lime a day. Next to the main structure are two pot kilns which are also largely intact. These kilns were built later than the main structure, but also ceased operation in 1926.

The lime works were originally served by a tramway, which ran from the direction of Rhoose (east of the lime works). It passed either side of the now demolished winch house. A tramway ramp (also demolished) allowed carts containing pebbles of between 3 & 4 inches (100 mm) in diameter to be conveyed to the top of the works and then into the kilns.

== Aberthaw Lime ==
Aberthaw Lime is well known for being Hydraulic lime. A 1 to 1 mixture of Aberthaw Lime and Pozzolana was reported to be considered for the construction of the Eddystone Lighthouse. However, it would seem that although he tested using Aberthaw Lime, John Smeaton actually used lime from Watchet. It was the subject of an important series of experiments in 1756-7 undertaken by John Smeaton to test the setting qualities of lime in sea water preparatory to designing and building the Eddystone Lighthouse. The fame it got from its use at the Eddystone and other lighthouses led to increased demand which could not be fully met until this major new works was built. The arrival of the railway enabled it to be properly serviced with the necessary coal for firing, as well as the ability to transport the lime away.

== Architecture of Aberthaw Lime Works ==
Interior

Kilns lined with firebrick, with stone lined tunnels and iron doors.

Exterior

Coursed quarry faced local limestone rubble with red brick quoins. Tall (about 20m) battered walls with two semi-circular openings on the west side and charge holes on top. A pair of very large and massively built lime kilns, which brought a new scale of working to the lime burning industry, being able to burn 300 tons of limestone at a time. The kilns were charged automatically via a tramway and a tipping device, which brought waggon loads of lime and coal directly to the charge holes on the top.

== See also ==
- Aberthaw
- Aberthaw Cement Works
