= East Aberthaw Coast =

Protected area in Glamorgan, Wales

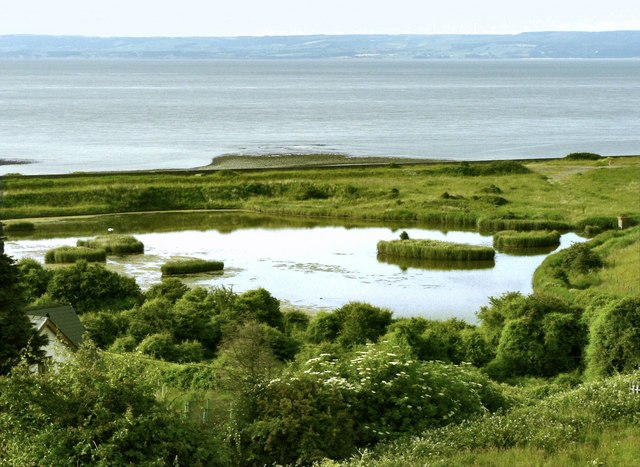
Lagoon on The Leys of East Aberthaw

East Aberthaw Coast is a Site of Special Scientific Interest in the Vale of Glamorgan, south Wales. Villages in the area include Aberthaw (East and West) and Gileston. Part of this area of the coast is known as The Leys or Leys Beach.

== See also ==
- List of Sites of Special Scientific Interest in Mid & South Glamorgan
