= The Blue Anchor Inn =

Pub in the Vale of Glamorgan, Wales

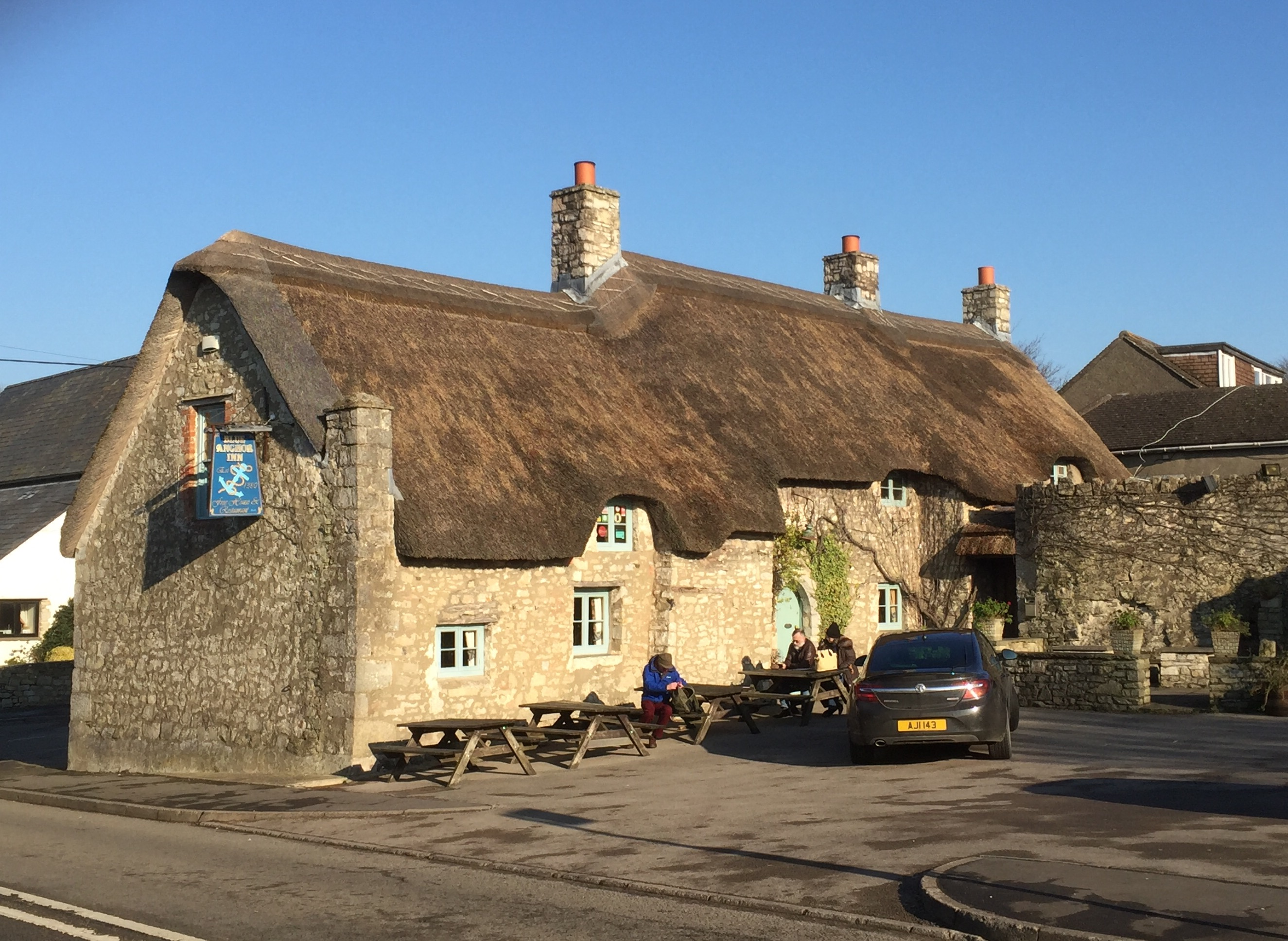
- The Blue Anchor Inn in 2016
- Interactive map of The Blue Anchor Inn

General information
- Location: East Aberthaw, Wales
- Coordinates: 51°23′27.6″N 3°23′17.7″W
- Year built: c. 16th century
- Owner: Jeremy and Andrew Coleman

Website
- www.blueanchoraberthaw.com

Listed Building – Grade II*
- Official name: The Blue Anchor Inn PH
- Designated: 28 January 1963
- Reference no.: 13614

The Blue Anchor Inn is a Grade II* listed inn in Aberthaw, Vale of Glamorgan, south Wales.

== History ==
The building is said by the owners to be from 1380, but Cadw state it is from the 16th century. It is a long low building with walls and low timber beams, with a thatched roof. The inn was used as a tobacco drying shed during the smuggling days. It became a listed building in 1963. Until 1941 the Blue Anchor belonged to the Fonmon Estate. Bill Coleman became landlord and then passed it on to his son, John. John retired in 1987, passing it on to his two sons, Jeremy and Andrew Coleman who currently run it. Jeremy's son Richard works as a manager, making him the fourth generation of Coleman. The inn caught fire in 1922, 2004, and again in 2009, the last fire burning about 30% of the thatched roof.

In 2008, the "Great Pubs of Wales", presented by John Sparkes, was filmed here. In 2010 a scene from the Hollywood blockbuster Killer Elite starring Robert De Niro, Clive Owen and Jason Statham was also shot here. More recently, a Bollywood thriller called "Aseq" was filmed here, and a number of BBC shoots have been filmed here too.

== Architecture ==
The inn is a traditional Welsh thatch roofed, with old stonework and beams which retain a medieval feel. The Good Pub Guide said of "It's the appealing warren of little rooms and cosy corners in this character-laden, 600-year-old tavern that provide its appeal. The building has massive walls, low-beamed rooms and tiny doorways, with open fires everywhere, including one in an inglenook with antique oak seats built into its stripped stonework. Other seats and tables are worked into a series of chatty little alcoves, and the more open front bar still has an ancient lime-ash floor." The pub serves various ales and is also noted for its gastronomy.
