= Boys Village =

Coordinates: 51.395°N 3.4006°W

St Athan Boys' Village
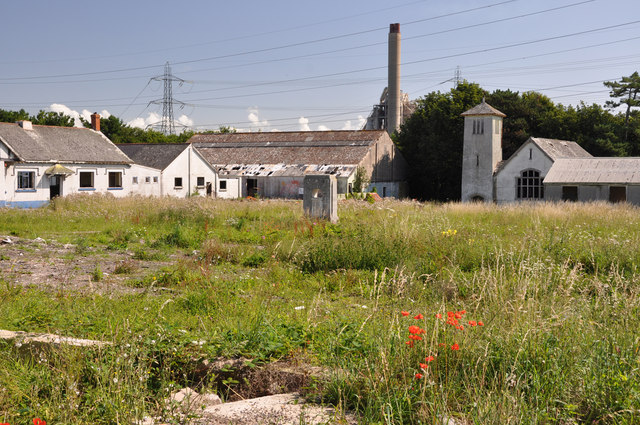
- St Athan Boys Village

- Location within the Vale of Glamorgan
- OS grid reference: ST0267
- Principal area: Vale of Glamorgan
- Country: Wales
- Sovereign state: United Kingdom
- Police: South Wales
- Fire: South Wales
- Ambulance: Welsh

St Athan Boys' Village was a village-style holiday camp located in West Aberthaw, Vale of Glamorgan, Wales.

== Development and operations ==
Philanthropist David Davies, 1st Baron Davies of Llandinam and president of the Ocean Coal Company and his Welfare Officer Captain J. Glynn Jones, co-founders of the Boys' Clubs of Wales were first inspired to build a holiday camp for the sons of miners from the South Wales Coalfield in the early 1920s after attending a youth camp in Kent. Opened on August 8, 1925, the camp offered them an escape from the polluted and unhealthy atmosphere of Valleys industrial towns and a place to play and be free, as well as being close to the nearby beach.

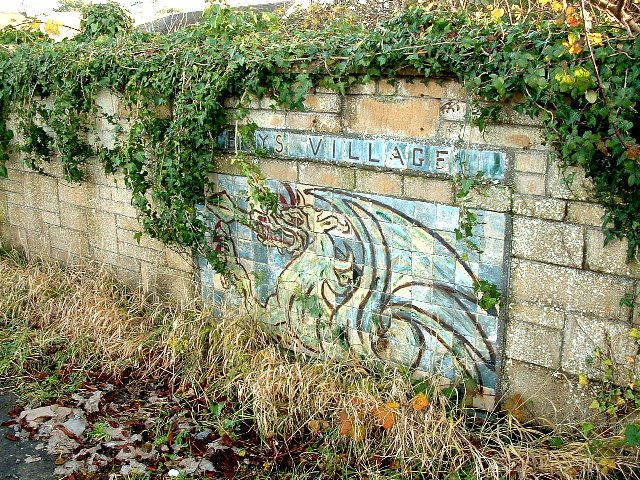

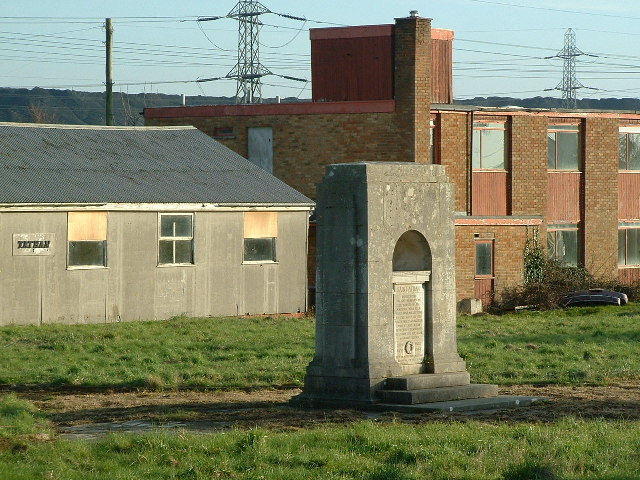

The buildings included a dining hall, dormitories, a gym, swimming pool, workshops and a church. There was also a full-sized cricket pitch, putting green, tennis courts, football and rugby grounds and a pavilion. A War Memorial in the centre of the complex commemorated men from the coalfields who had lost their lives in the two World Wars

The camp was requisitioned in 1940 for military use but returned to civilian use in 1946. In 1962, the centre was refurbished and a youth hostel opened on site as well as facilities for teaching work-related skills such as mechanical engineering.

Use of the village declined with the growth of cheap holidays abroad and the decline in coal mining in the Welsh valleys. In 1990, the Boys' Clubs of Wales, the organisation responsible for running the camp, went into administration, forcing the site's closure.

== Status ==
After closure, the site was used for residential Bible courses by various church groups. Sold in 2000 to a new owner, it was rented to a family who lived in the former caretaker's cottage and used the yard for farm storage. When they moved out in 2008 it was taken over by airsoft enthusiasts but with no on-site security it soon became a target for metal theft, vandalism and arson. Various buildings on site were subsequently demolished from 2008 due to extensive fire damage, including the Sir Maynard Jenour block (named after the Welsh industrialist) and the recreation buildings. The swimming pool roof which collapsed some years after the site's closure was also removed.

In 2010, the owner placed the site on the market. Unprotected by any form of conservation order, the site could be cleared for redevelopment.

In June 2011 the area was secured with gates and fences, as well as large boulders and rubble to deter vehicles from parking near the site, but by 2012 most of these had themselves been vandalised.

As of late 2013 the site has been divided into 6 building plots, each plot has planning permission to convert the existing buildings into residential dwellings. As of Nov 2013 3 of the plots appear to have been sold STC. The war memorial will remain in the center of the cul-de-sac.

In April 2016 a Planning application was made to produce 40% affordable housing by demolishing all buildings and redeveloping the church and caretaker's bungalow.

By 2021, the village was seen on the market for sale.

== In popular culture ==
In 2010, the Welsh post-hardcore band Funeral For A Friend shot the video there to their song "Serpents in Solitude" from their EP Young and Defenceless.

In 2011, the English band Deaf Havana filmed the video there to their song "I'm A Bore, Mostly". The graffiti featured in this video is genuine.

In 2011, the BBC aired a short film, Boys' Village, starring students of Stagecoach Theatre Arts and Cardiff High School on BBC2 (Wales). The film was subsequently released on DVD as part of the Peccadillo Pictures release Boys On Film X.

In 2011, The Welsh pop-punk band Save Your Breath shot the video to their song "Nothing Worth Having Comes Easy".

In 2012, Welsh hardcore band Brutality Will Prevail filmed the video there to their song " The Path".

In 2019, Doctor Who filmed the series 12 finale episode, "Ascension of the Cybermen", using the village as the last human colony far in the future.

Popular rumours persist about the village being haunted or plagued by a troubled past. To date, no evidence has been found to support these claims.

== Bibliography ==
- AFTER TEN YEARS, A Report of Miners' Welfare Work in the South Wales Coalfield, 1921 - 1931. Published by The Ocean Area Recreation Union.
