= Aberthaw power stations =

Two decommissioned power stations in Wales

Aberthaw Power Station
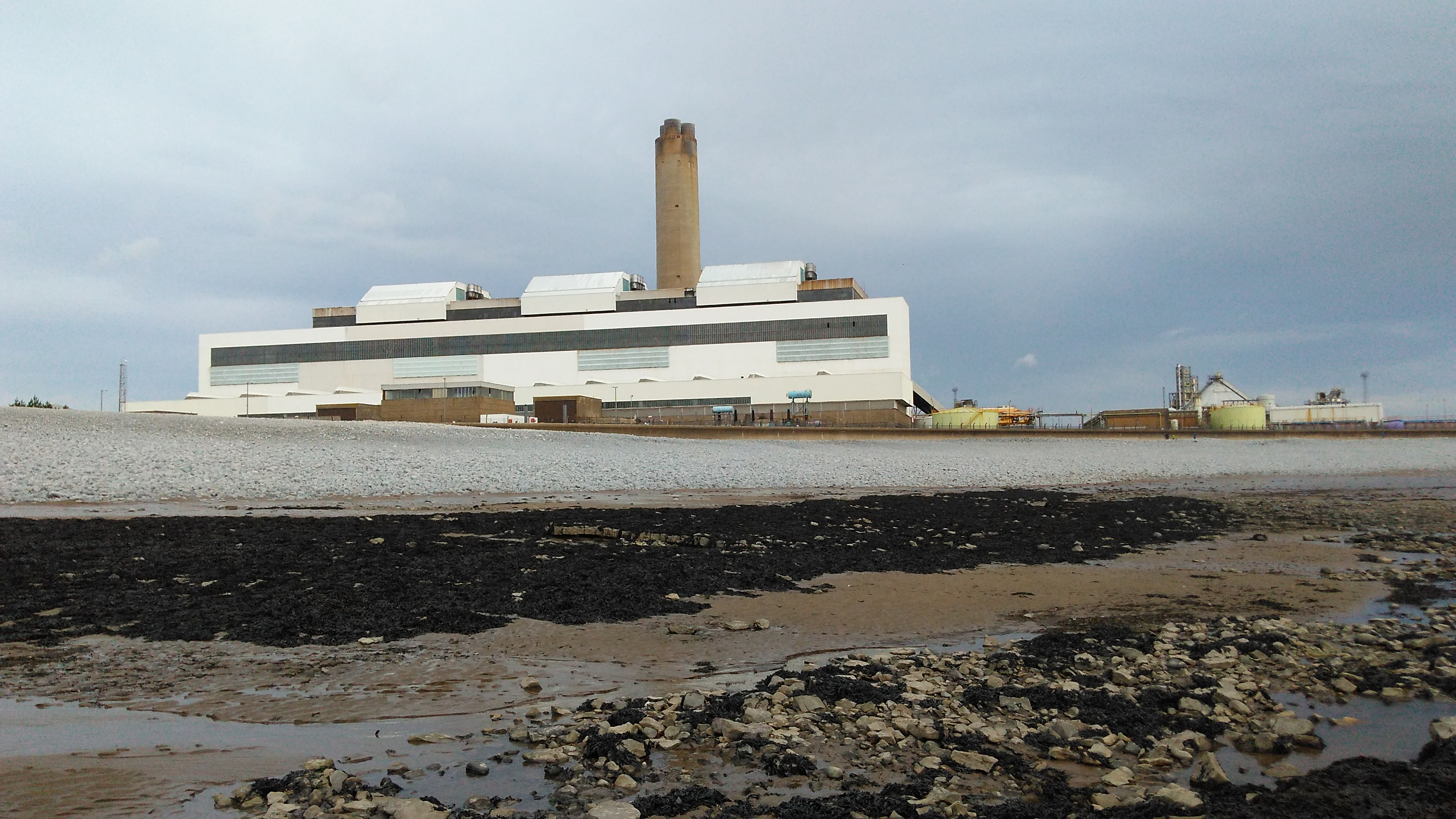
- Aberthaw B from the foreshore
- Country: Wales, United Kingdom
- Location: Barry, Vale of Glamorgan
- Coordinates: 51.387312°N 3.404866°W
- Status: In Decommissioning Process
- Construction began: 1957 (Aberthaw A); 1967 (Aberthaw B)
- Commission date: 1963 (Aberthaw A); 1971 (Aberthaw B)
- Decommission date: 1995 (Aberthaw A); 2020 (Aberthaw B)
- Construction cost: £50m (Aberthaw B)
- Owner: RWE
- Operator: RWE
- Employees: ≈5

Thermal power station
- Primary fuel: Coal

Power generation
- Units operational: 3 x 520 MW
- Make and model: Associated Electrical Industries
- Nameplate capacity: 1,560 MW

External links
- Website: https://uk-ireland.rwe.com/locations/aberthaw-power-plant
- Commons: Related media on Commons

Two decommissioned coal-fired and co-fired biomass power stations, both known as Aberthaw power station, have operated at Limpert Bay, near the villages of Gileston and West Aberthaw in the Vale of Glamorgan. The most recent of the two, Aberthaw B Power Station, co-fired biomass and had a generating capacity of 1,560 megawatts (MW). The power station closed on 31 March 2020.

The station was the location of a carbon capture trial system to determine whether the technology could be scaled up from lab conditions. The system consumed 1 MW.

== History ==
The site of the stations was a golf course before the construction of the first station. Aberthaw was constructed by the Central Electricity Generating Board (CEGB) under the chairmanship of Christopher Hinton. It is known as one of the original Hinton Heavies, a series of new 500 MW units procured at the time. Aberthaw "A" Power Station, although recorded as first generating power on 7 February 1960, officially opened on 29 October 1963, and at the time it was the most advanced in the world. Aberthaw "B" station opened in 1971. Aberthaw "A" operated until 1995. It was subsequently demolished. Its two 425 feet (130 m) chimneys were the last section to be demolished, and this was done on Saturday, 25 July 1998. The site had three generating units, each driven by its own Foster-Wheeler boiler. In 2006–2007 new steam turbines were fitted, allowing each unit to generate an extra 28–30 MW of power. Each unit was rated at 520 MW.

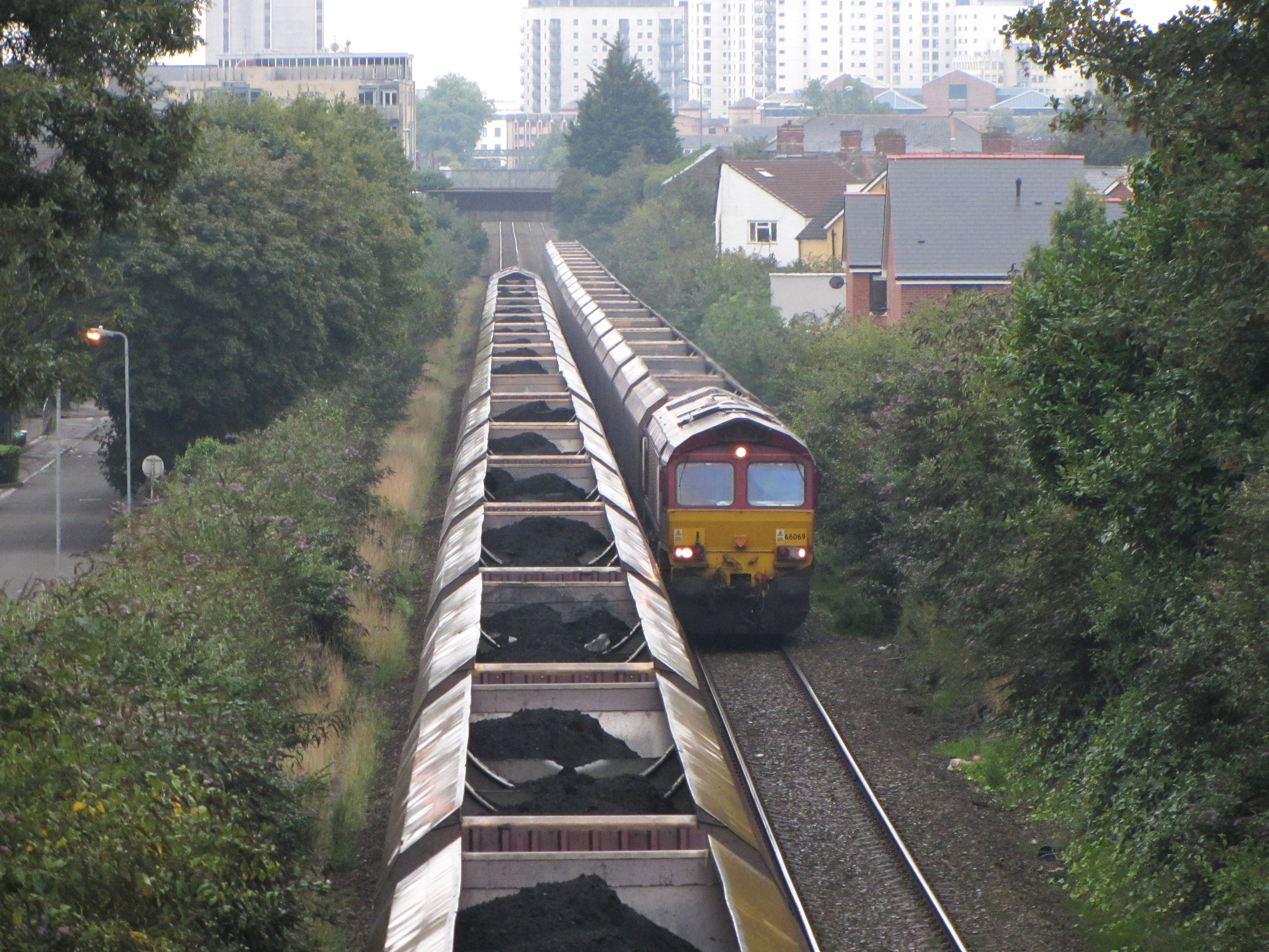
Coal trains passing, en-route between Cwm Bargoed and Aberthaw (2014)

== Operations ==
Aberthaw burned approximately 5,000–6,000 tonnes of fuel a day. The site usually burned two-thirds Welsh coal with the remainder being either foreign low-sulphur coal or biomass.

=== Rail facilities ===
The station took its entire coal feed stock in by rail from the Vale of Glamorgan Line, under contract to DBS. Rail facilities included east- and west-facing connections to the main line, three reception sidings, No. 8 and No. 9 merry-go-round loop lines, two gross-weight and tare-weight weighbridges, two hopper wagon discharge hoppers, a former fly ash siding, an oil discharge siding, two sidings adjacent to the former A station, and two exchange sidings.

=== Aberthaw A ===
The A station had six 100 MW turbo-alternators giving a gross output of 600 MW. The boilers operated on pulverised coal and delivered 570 kg/s of steam at 103.4 bar and 524 °C. Station cooling was by sea water. In 1980/1 the station sent out 1,718.786 GWh, and the thermal efficiency was 30.23 per cent. Aberthaw A was one of the CEGB's 20 steam power stations with the highest thermal efficiency; the thermal efficiency was 34.08 per cent in 1963–4, 34.67 per cent in 1964–5, and 34.27 per cent in 1965–6. Four units were decommissioned in 1995.

The output from the A station was as follows:

Annual electricity output of Aberthaw A
Year	1960–1	1961–2	1962–3	1963–4	1964–5	1965–6	1966–7	1971–2	1978–9	1980–1	1981–2
Electricity supplied, GWh	575.1	1848.1	2828.3	4,117	4,221	4,153	4,020	2,229	1,618	1,719	1,580

=== Aberthaw B ===
The B station had 2 × 462 MW and 1 × 475 MW turbo-alternators giving a gross output of 1,399 MW. The boilers operated on pulverised coal and delivered 1,170 kg/s of steam at 158.6 bar and 566 °C. Station cooling was by sea water. In 1978/9 the station sent out 4,083.124 GWh, and in 1980/1 it sent out 5,620.143 GWh.

There was a gas-turbine generating facility at Aberthaw, commissioned in February 1967. There were three 17.5 MW gas turbines with a total rating of 52.5 MW, and they delivered 0.392 GWh in the year 1980/1.

Until its closure, the Tower Colliery in Hirwaun supplied much of the coal for Aberthaw. Until 2017 coal came from the Ffos-y-fran Land Reclamation Scheme in Merthyr Tydfil. Other sources included: the Aberpergwm drift and opencast mines in the Neath Valley; the Cwmgwrach Colliery via the Onllwyn Washery; and the Tower Opencast mine based at the site of the original Tower Colliery. Further stocks were sourced from abroad, primarily Russia, and shipped in via the ports of Portbury, Avonmouth and Newport Docks.

In response to the UK government's renewable energy obligation that came into effect in April 2002, the station began firing a range of biomass materials to replace some of the coal burned. This was due to Welsh coal being less volatile than other coal and as such producing more sulphur dioxide and carbon monoxide.

== Flue gas desulphurisation ==
Aberthaw B was due for closure, but in June 2005 station owners Npower agreed to reduce sulphur dioxide emissions by installing flue-gas desulphurisation (FGD) equipment. This was to reduce sulphur dioxide levels by 90% by 2008, when new European environmental regulations came into effect. Construction of the equipment started on 21 June 2006, with a tree planting ceremony attended by the Welsh Minister for Enterprise, Innovation and Networks, Andrew Davies. The desulphurisation FGD project was being carried out by a consortium of Alstom and Amec Foster Wheeler, which was to have employed 500 workers on site at the peak of construction.

== Nuclear proposal ==
In 2006, it was reported that consultants for the Department of Trade and Industry had identified the site as a suitable location for a nuclear power station, based on the existing infrastructure and logistics. However, the department commented: "We are conducting an energy review. The review is to see whether there should be a nuclear element to Britain's energy plan, and it would be a bit odd to identify sites for nuclear power stations at this time."

== Court case ==
On 26 March 2015, the BBC reported that the UK government was being taken to court by the European Commission over excess emissions of nitrogen oxides from Aberthaw power station. This issue was raised in the National Assembly for Wales on 10 November 2015 by Bethan Jenkins AM.

== Closure and redevelopment ==
The station's closure was first announced on 1 August 2019. The station officially closed on 31 March 2020, the same date of closure as Fiddler's Ferry power station in Widnes, Cheshire.

The site of Aberthaw Power Station has been suggested as a site for tidal energy generation, with the Cardiff Capital Region confirming its intention to buy the site. It was confirmed on 3 March 2022 that the Capital Region had bought the site from RWE for £8 million. The transfer, comprising the former power station and 500 acres of land, was finalised in March 2023. The Cardiff Capital Region announced it had earmarked £30 million to fund the work needed to demolish the station, and to begin redeveloping the site as a clean energy hub.

In February 2026, the turbine hall and deaerator bays underwent a controlled demolition.

On 12 June 2026, the 500ft tall chimney stack was also brought down as part of the decommissioning and demolition process.

On 2 July 2026, a large fire broke out at the station. The blaze took hours to control with Fire Services all over South East Wales being called to contain the fire.

== See also ==
- Aberthaw Cement Works
- Aberthaw lime works
- List of active coal-fired power stations in the United Kingdom
- npower UK
