= Aberthaw Cement Works =

Cement works in the Vale of Glamorgan, Wales

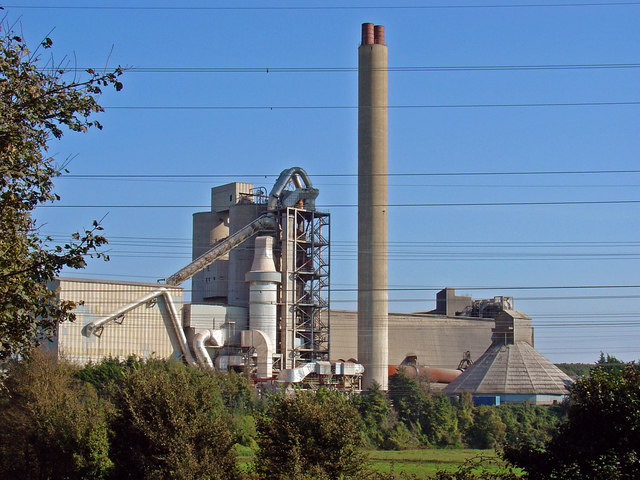
Aberthaw Cement Works showing Kiln 6

Aberthaw Cement Works are cement works in the Vale of Glamorgan near the village of East Aberthaw in Wales.

== History ==
The Blue Lias limestone of Aberthaw was a source of hydraulic lime from early times, and it was made famous when it was selected by John Smeaton for the construction of the Eddystone Lighthouse but various records of Aberthaw Blue Lias limestone's processing are not consistent. Evidently, limestone pebbles from Aberthaw's coastline were transported inland for burning at other limekilns but much was shipped across the Bristol Channel from the Port of Aberthaw, for burning at Three Kilns, Cleeve Hill, near Watchet, Somerset. One historical account states that John Smeaton used Watchet's burned lime which was shipped to Millbay, Plymouth for his Eddystone lighthouse construction in 1756. It was not until 1888 that a (pebble) limeworks and kilns, were constructed alongside Pleasant Harbour, East Aberthaw but that works, which had become rail-served by 1892, closed in 1926. It is on record that geologically, the limestone seam at Aberthaw runs under the Bristol Channel and is also present at Watchet.

The Aberthaw and Bristol Channel Portland Cement Company was established in 1912 by the Beynon family. The site at Aberthaw was chosen as it was near the necessary raw material, limestone and coal from the South Wales coalfield which was needed to heat the kilns. The works started in 1914 with two small wet process kilns with a production capacity of 120 tonnes per day each. The first consignment of cement left Aberthaw works by rail in 1914. A third wet kiln was ordered in 1913 and erected in 1916 during the first World War, and a fourth kiln was added and running by June 1958. This brought clinker capacity to 1200 tonnes per day.

In 1967, Kiln 5 (51.39743°N 3.393965°W) was installed. This was a much more efficient dry process kiln. The wet process kilns were decommissioned in 1974, and Kiln 6 - also a dry kiln - (51.397507°N 3.394326°W) was started in 1975. Kiln 6 remains in operation today.

In 1919 the company took over the nearby Aberthaw and Rhoose Point Portland and Lime Company. Blue Circle bought the two sites at Aberthaw and Rhoose in 1983. In 1987, Rhoose Works closed and was later completely demolished. The former Rhoose works kiln firing fuel had gone from coal to oil, then gas. The same applied to Aberthaw but reversion to coal came in 1979 but Aberthaw plant was authorised to burn whole tyres as fuel from 2013, with no impact on the environment.

Lafarge Cement UK bought Blue Circle industries PLC in 2001, creating the largest cement maker in the world. Cement from the site is carried to destinations by Road and Rail (rail services being provided by Freightliner heavy haul and Colas Rail over the Vale of Glamorgan Line). In July 2020, it was observed that Aberthaw cement in bulk was being shipped in large consignments by PCA rail tank wagons equipped for pressure unloading at destination, thus considerably reducing the number of bulk cement road tankers on the highways.

Watercolour artist Thomas Frederick Worrall worked for a few years at the cement works from when it was first opened.

== See also ==
- Aberthaw
- Aberthaw Power Station
- Aberthaw lime works
