= David Gwilym John =

Welsh cartoonist

David Gwilym John (1884–1958?), sometimes known as D. Gwilym John or D. G. John, was a Welsh cartoonist, best known as the creator of the cartoon character Dai Lossin.

== Life ==
John was born to Catherine and William John at Pancross in the Vale of Glamorgan, Wales in the early months of 1884. He was the cartoonist for the Football Echo, a Saturday sports paper and was noted for the character he created, Dai Lossin. The character of Dai Lossin became "something of a folk-hero" and his name became commonly used as a way to refer to any "likeable rogue" character.

British political cartoonist Leslie Gilbert Illingworth called John "a comic genius" and said his cartoon character, Dai Lossin "epitomised the deadpan ironical understatement of Vale wit". D. G. John, as he was known to friends, was the father of Godfrey John.

There is a plaque on the house in Rhoose, where he lived and worked for a number of years.
