= Gileston =

Coordinates: 51.394°N 3.412°W

Gileston: Welsh: Silstwn
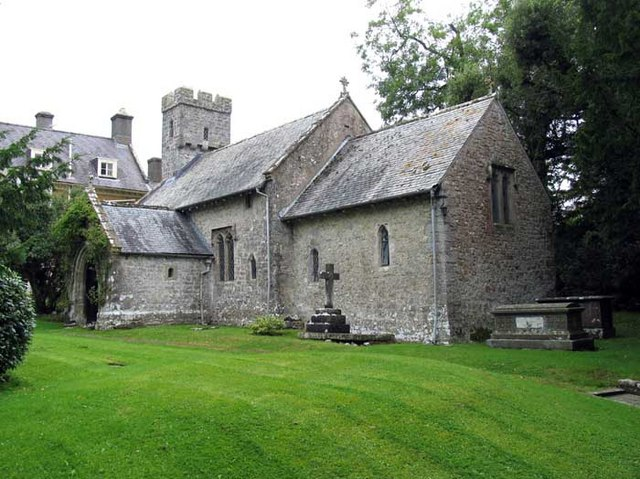
- St. Giles Church

- Location within the Vale of Glamorgan
- OS grid reference: ST019670
- Principal area: Vale of Glamorgan
- Preserved county: South Glamorgan
- Country: Wales
- Sovereign state: United Kingdom
- Postcode district: CF
- Police: South Wales
- Fire: South Wales
- Ambulance: Welsh
- UK Parliament: Vale of Glamorgan
- Senedd Cymru – Welsh Parliament: Vale of Glamorgan

Gileston (Welsh: Silstwn) is a small Welsh village near West Aberthaw in the Vale of Glamorgan on the coast of South Wales.

== Location ==
It is located some 15 miles along the coast from Cardiff and lies between Barry and Llantwit Major. Breaksea Point is the second most southerly point of Wales, after Rhoose Point.

== Amenities & History ==
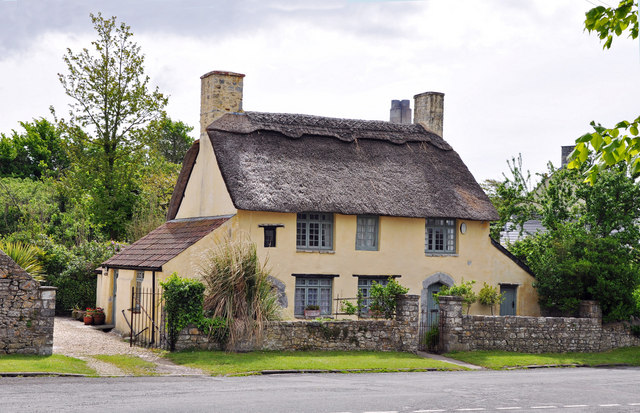
Thatched cottage

Barry Golf Club, The Leys, Gileston, (now defunct) was founded in 1897/8. In 1917 a new professional arrived at Barry Golf Club by the name of David James Rees. His four-year-old son, Dai Rees, learned the game there and went on to become a legend in world golf, captaining the British Ryder Cup team which beat America in 1957. The club and course was lost in 1957 when Aberthaw Power Station was built on the site.

Gileston/West Aberthaw beach overlooking Limpert Bay has a number of pillboxes which still stand from World War II. It has the arable farm of the Thomas family who have farmed the surrounding land for over 100 years.

The village is tiny and previously consisted of little more than the church and the Gileston Manor. In 1771 the Bishop of Llandaff recorded that the population consisted of the rector and his family (who was also the squire of the manor house); a farmer, his wife, son and four servants; an old man and an old woman.

== Gallery ==
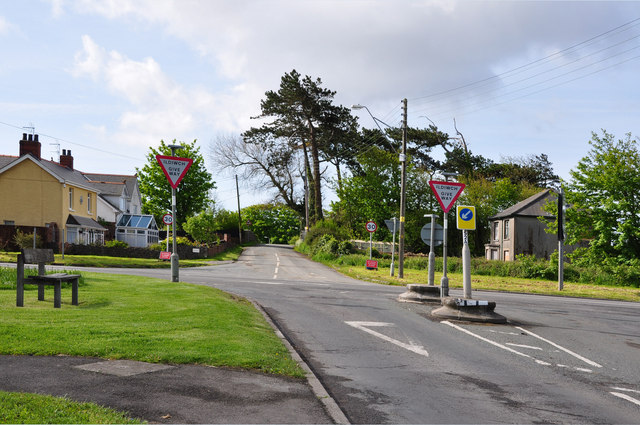
Gileston Road coming from St Athan looking across the B4265 road towards Gileston (see google map)

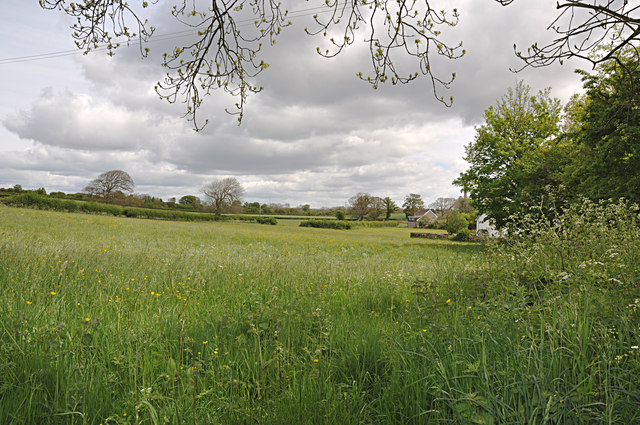
Meadow

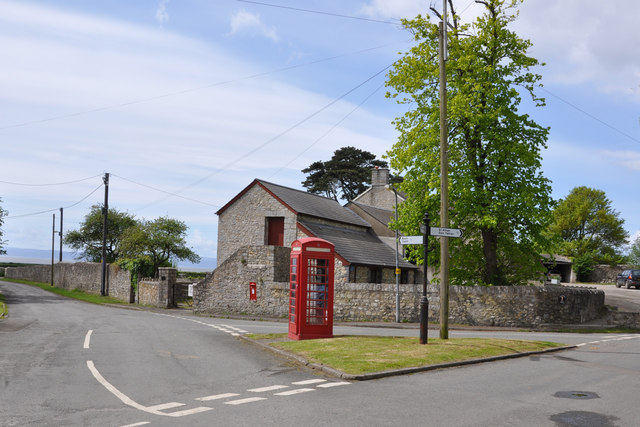
Central village roundabout

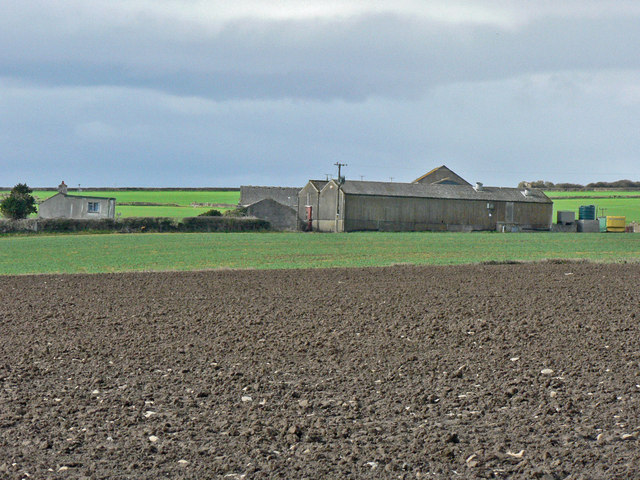
Gileston Farm

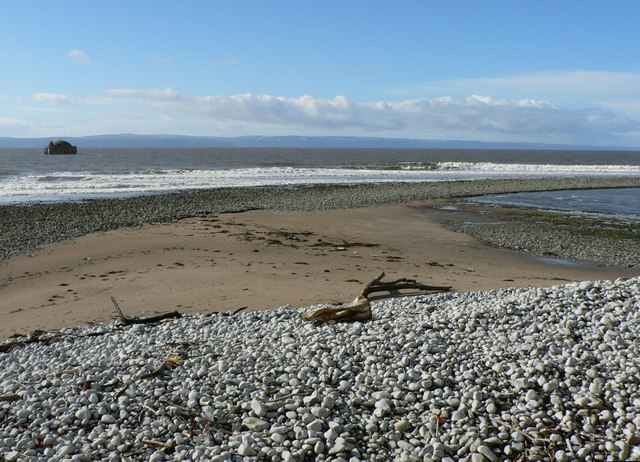
Coast at Gileston

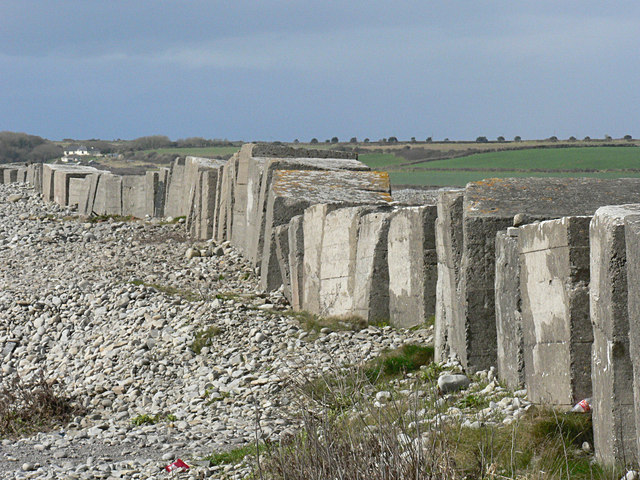
Coastal defense wall

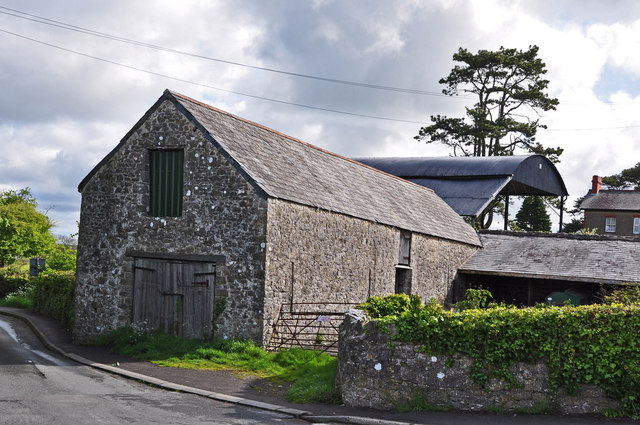
Old barn
