= Limpert Bay =

Limpert Bay (Welsh: Bae Limpert) is a bay of the Bristol Channel, west of Aberthaw in south-east Wales.

The beach is rock with some sand. There is a guest house and a free car park next to some cottage ruins. An information stand at the beach gives the history of the area, provided by the Heritage Cost.

The Wildlife Trust for Wales has helped record over one thousand species at this location, sixty-two of which are of principal concern to the conservation to the biodiversity of Wales.

== History ==
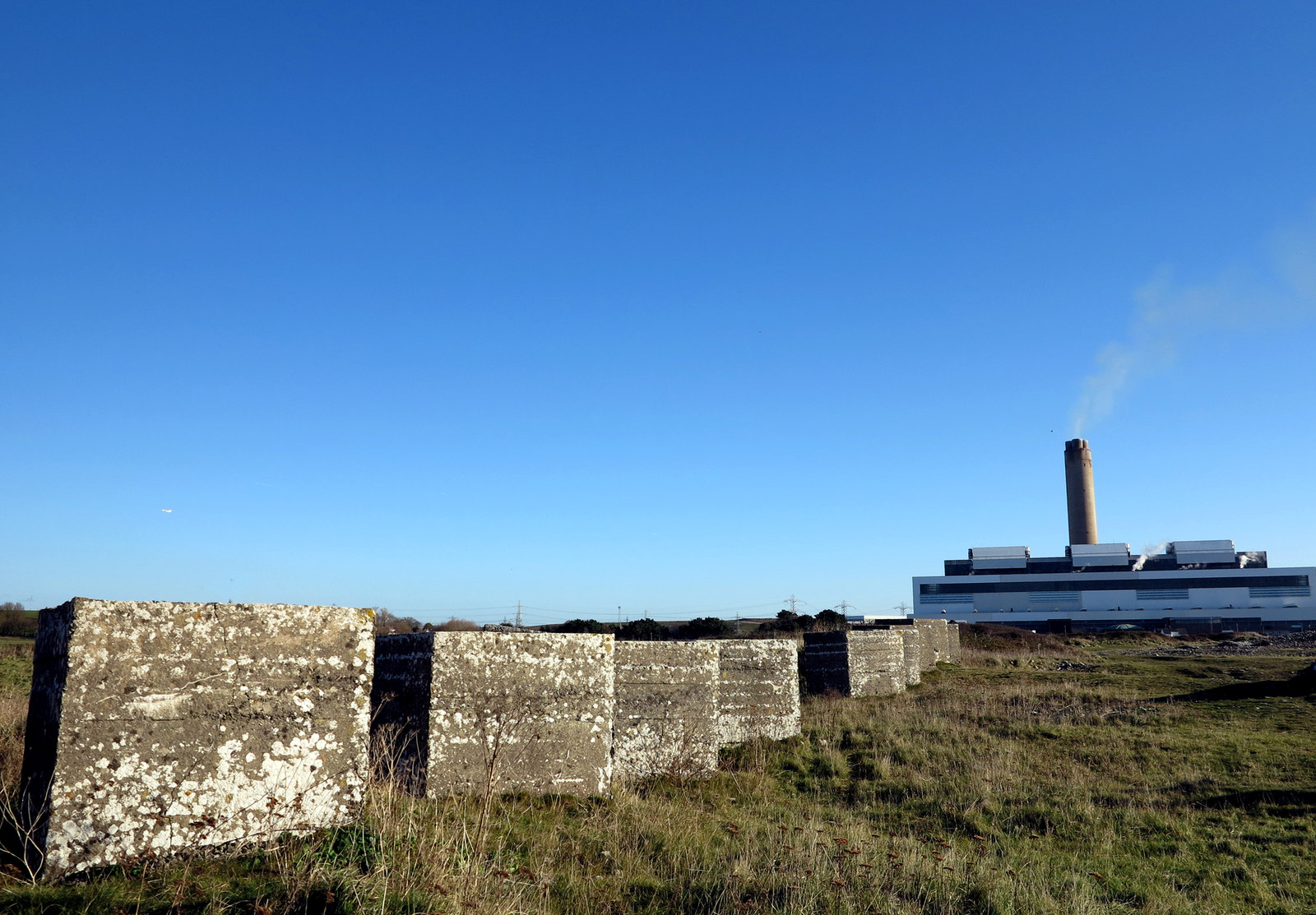
Anti-tank cubes along the coast

During World War II; Limpert Bay's defences formed part of the Western Command's coastal "crust" defences for the Vale of Glamorgan. Defences included anti-tank cubes, pill boxes, and an anti-tank ditch.

== Industrial area ==
The beach is next to the decommissioned Aberthaw power stations. Two seawater intakes for the power stations are in the bay. The Aberthaw Cement Works is nearby.

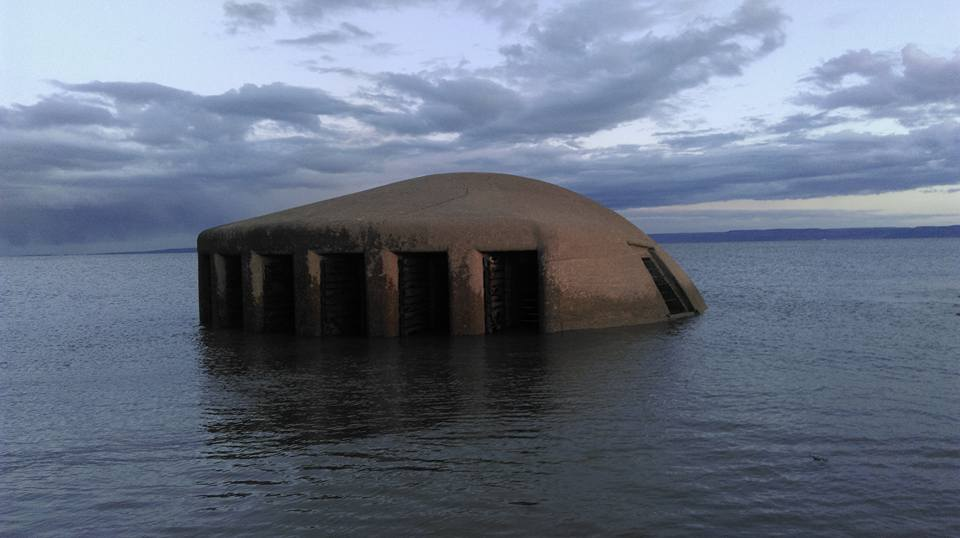
Water intake for Aberthaw Power Station in Limpert Bay
