= B4265 road =

Road in Wales

B4265
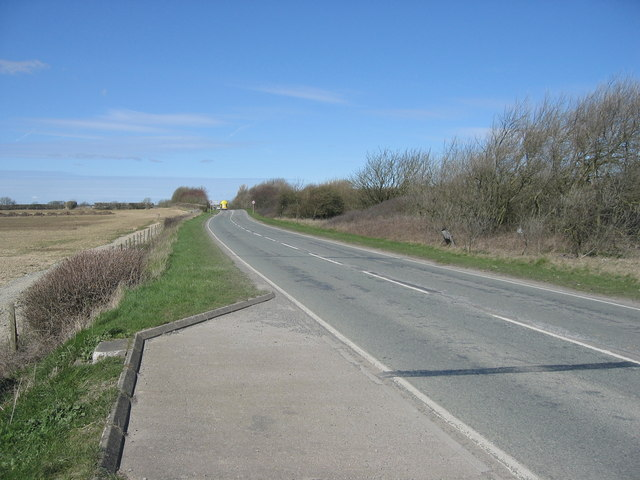

Route information
- Length: 15.9 mi (25.6 km)

Major junctions
- East end: Cardiff Airport
- A4226 Fonmon Castle; St Athan & Gileston; Boverton & Eglwys Brewis; Llantwit Major & Llanmaes; Wick; St Brides Major; Ewenny A48 A473
- West end: Bridgend

Location
- Country: United Kingdom

Road network
- Roads in the United Kingdom; Motorways; A and B road zones

The B4265 road (often known as the Barry-Llantwit road) is a main road in the Vale of Glamorgan, southeastern Wales, running in a northwesterly direction along near the coast. It links Cardiff Airport to Bridgend, lasting for 15.9 miles (25.6 km). The road begins at the roundabout near the airport and the village of Penmark at 51°24′21″N 3°20′39″W as a continuation of the A4226 road leading from Barry. Passing the junction turnoff to Gileston and St Athan, at Llantwit Major, the B4270 road branches off to the northwest to Llandow Industrial Estate. The road then moves progressively in northwesterly direction until St Brides Major, where the B4524 road to the south connects it to Southerndown and Ogmore-by-Sea. At St Brides Major, the road shifts to a northerly direction, where it passes Ewenny and Ogmore village leading to Bridgend, where it joins the A48 road and finally A473 road (Cowbridge Road) at 51°30′7″N 3°34′34″W.

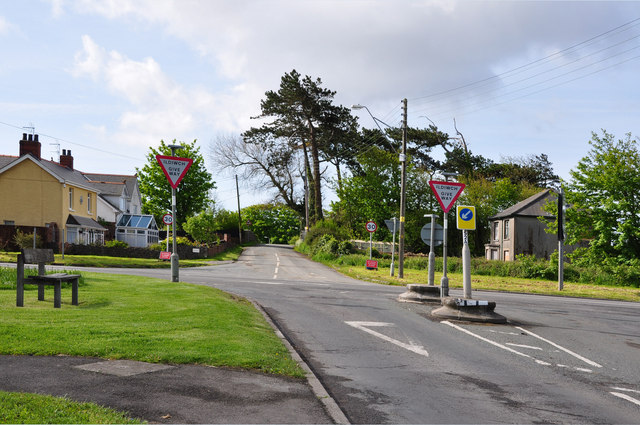
Crossroads approaching the B4265 between St Athan and Gileston (straight on)

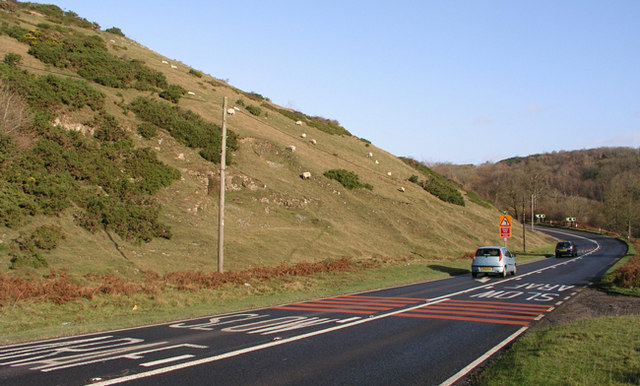
The road just north of St Brides Major

10 February 2014, road work began to straighten the road to allow better access to St Athan and Cardiff Airport Enterprise Zone.
