= Rhoose Point =

Coordinates: 51.38085°N 3.34202°W

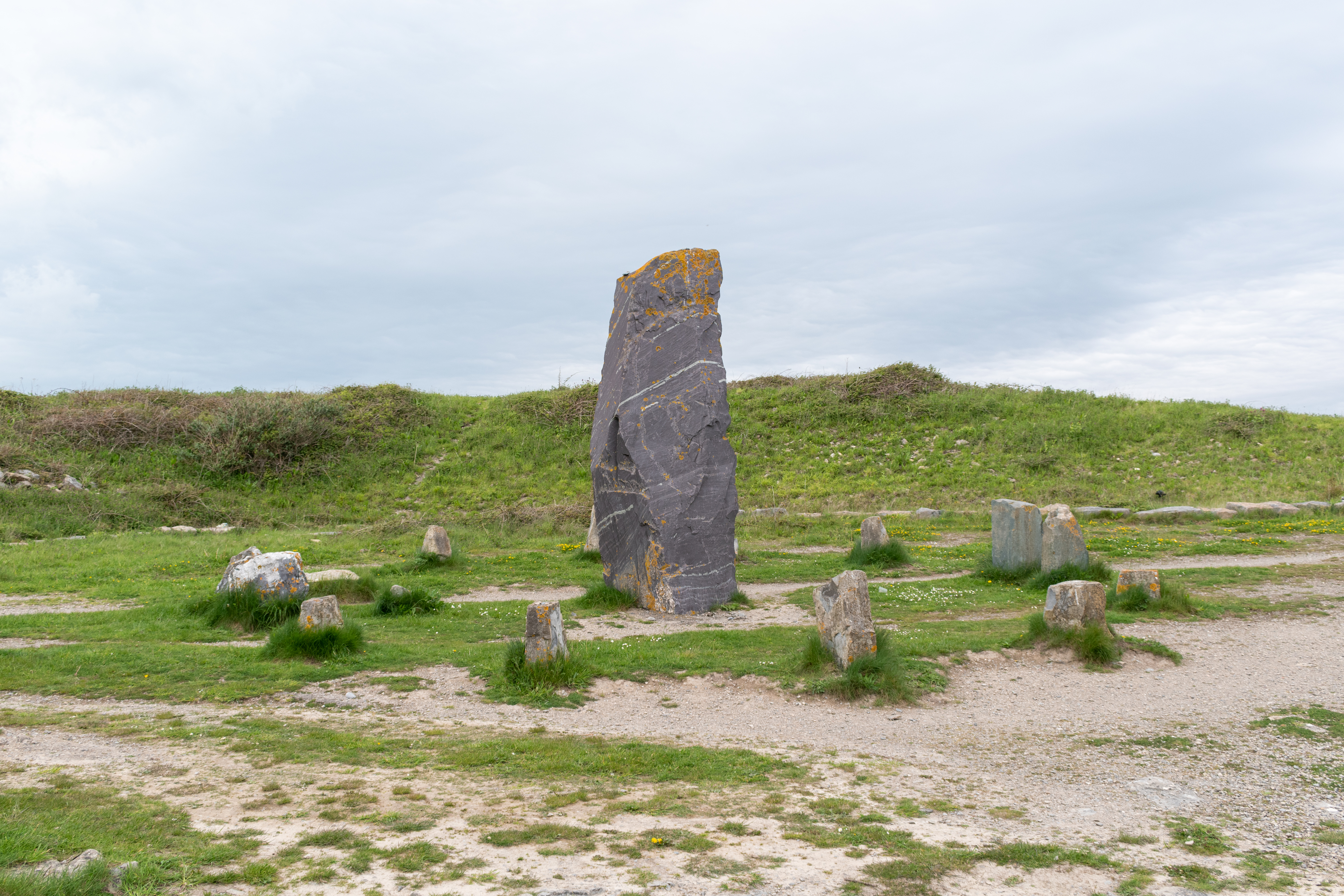
Standing stone and stone circle at Rhoose Point (erected 2000)

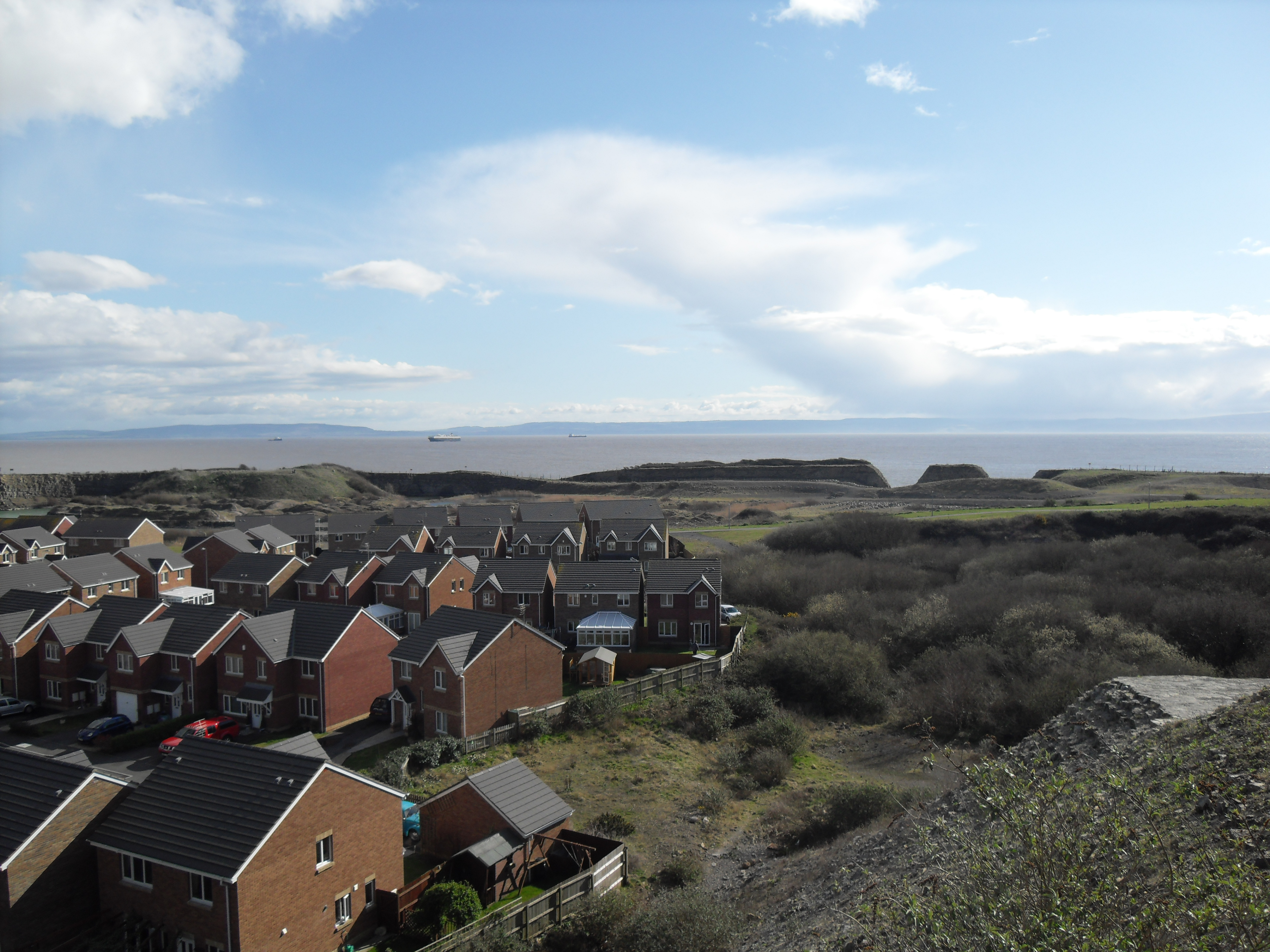
Part of Rhoose Point

Rhoose Point (Welsh: Trwyn y Rhws) is a headland and a settlement near the village of Rhoose in the Vale of Glamorgan, Wales. Rhoose Point is the most southerly point of mainland Wales. A permanent notice installed by The Vale of Glamorgan Council marks Rhoose Point as the most southerly part of Wales's mainland.

Rhoose cement works, an asbestos factory and a quarry used to be located to the north of Rhoose Point. This land has been reclaimed and is the site of the Rhoose Point housing scheme, where over 1,000 houses have greatly extended the village of Rhoose.

In 2000, a monument designed by David Lock Associates comprising a large standing stone in a stone circle was erected on reclaimed land by the development company Cofton (Wales) Ltd.
