= Rhoose =

Village in the Vale of Glamorgan, Wales

Rhoose: Welsh: Y Rhws
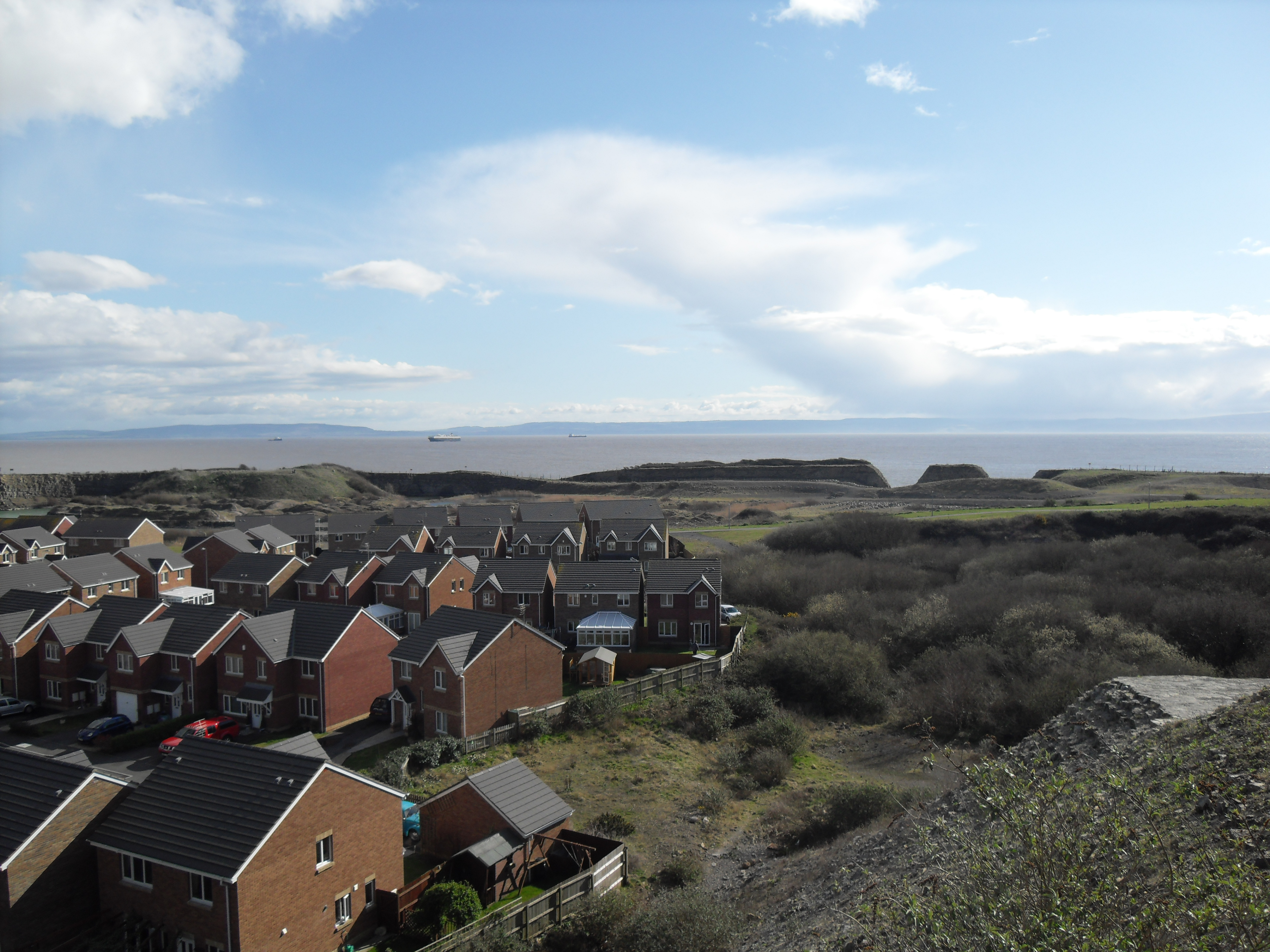
- View over part of Rhoose Point facing southeast

- Location within the Vale of Glamorgan
- Population: 6,160
- OS grid reference: ST060666
- Community: Rhoose
- Principal area: Vale of Glamorgan
- Preserved county: South Glamorgan
- Country: Wales
- Sovereign state: United Kingdom
- Post town: BARRY
- Postcode district: CF62
- Dialling code: 01446
- Police: South Wales
- Fire: South Wales
- Ambulance: Welsh
- UK Parliament: Vale of Glamorgan
- Senedd Cymru – Welsh Parliament: Vale of Glamorgan
- List of places UK Wales Vale of Glamorgan 51.39063°N 3.35236°W Map of the community

Rhoose (/ruːs/ ROOSS; Welsh: Y Rhws [ə ˈr̥uːs], from y rhos 'the moor') is a village and community near the sea (the Bristol Channel) in the Vale of Glamorgan, Wales, near Barry. The wider community includes villages and settlements such as Font-y-Gary, Penmark, East Aberthaw and Porthkerry. The population of the community in 2011 was 6,160.

== Description ==
The village is the location of Cardiff Airport, formerly RAF Rhoose. Commercial flights began in the 1950s and control passed to Glamorgan County Council in 1965, after which date the airport expanded.

The village also has a Holiday Park (Fontygary Leisure Park), some shops, a library, two public houses (The Fontygary Inn and the Highwayman), Rhoose Social Club, and an active Surf Lifesaving Club (Rhoose Lifeguards) established in 1968.

Rhoose is one of the fastest growing villages in the Vale of Glamorgan, with the three newest developments being "The Hollies", and more recently, Rhoose Point, and the newest development being the affluent Golwg y Mor (Welsh for "Sea View") development in the eastern part of the village. Further development of Rhoose Point was halted in 2008, because of concerns the drainage infrastructure would not cope.

Rhoose Cardiff International Airport railway station, which was scheduled to re-open in 2003, suffered numerous bureaucratic delays before eventually re-opening in June 2005. There are now hourly train services to Cardiff and Bridgend via Barry and the Vale of Glamorgan.

== Politics and administration ==
Rhoose does not have its own community council but gives its name of the electoral ward of Rhoose, represented by two county councillors on the Vale of Glamorgan Council.

A by-election was due to take place on 14 February 2019. Candidates included the sitting Conservative Party Senedd Member, Andrew RT Davies. Davies was duly elected and pledged to oppose plans by the Conservative-led council to close the local primary school.

Representation has historically been shared by the Labour Party and Conservative Party.

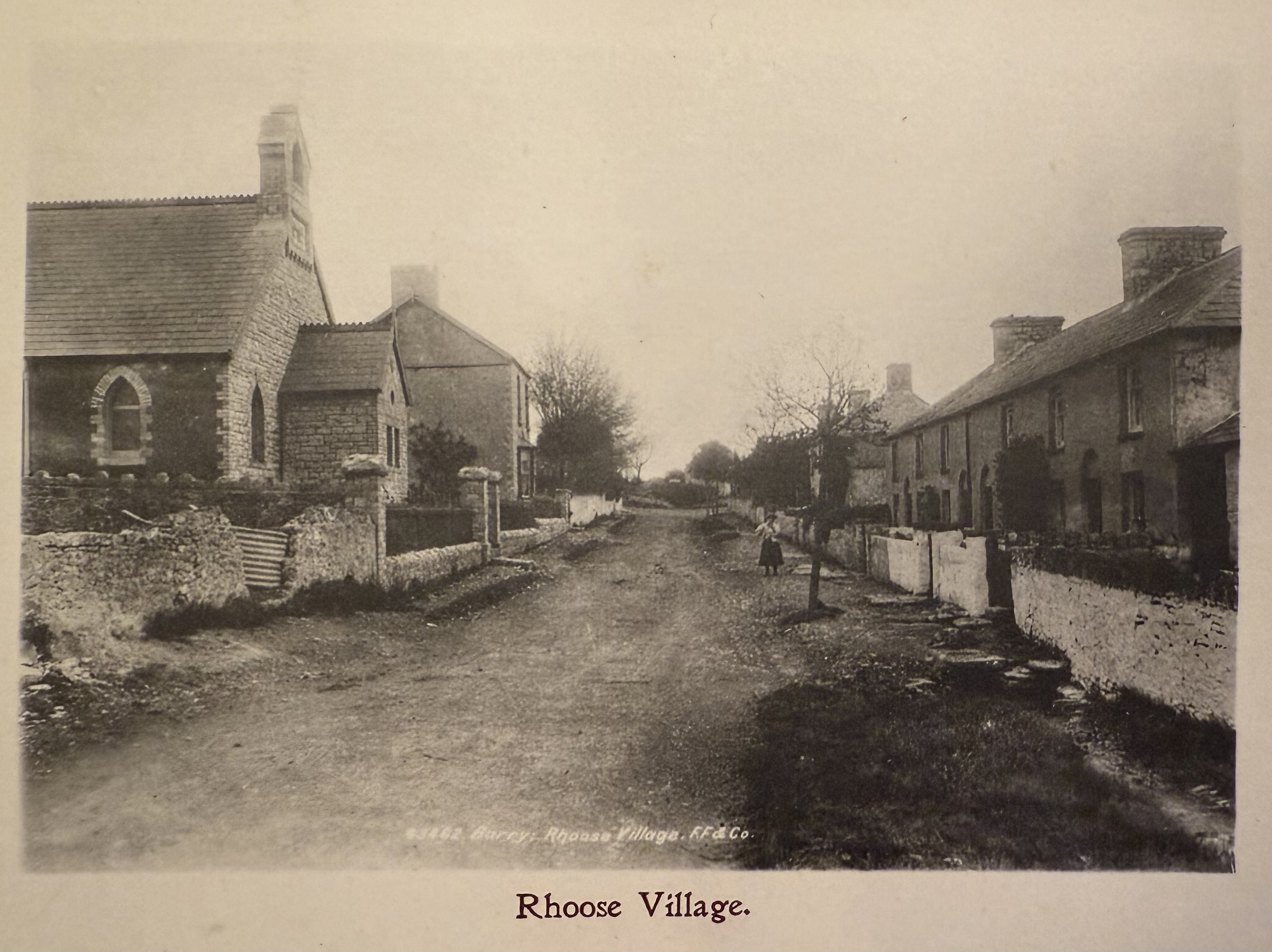
Rhoose Village, c 1905.

== Notable people ==
- Andrew RT Davies, lives in the community and was elected as leader of the Welsh Conservatives in 2019.
- David Gwilym John
