= Fonmon Castle =

Castle in the Vale of Glamorgan, Wales

- Welsh: Castell Ffwl-y-mwn
- Fonmon, Vale of Glamorgan, Wales
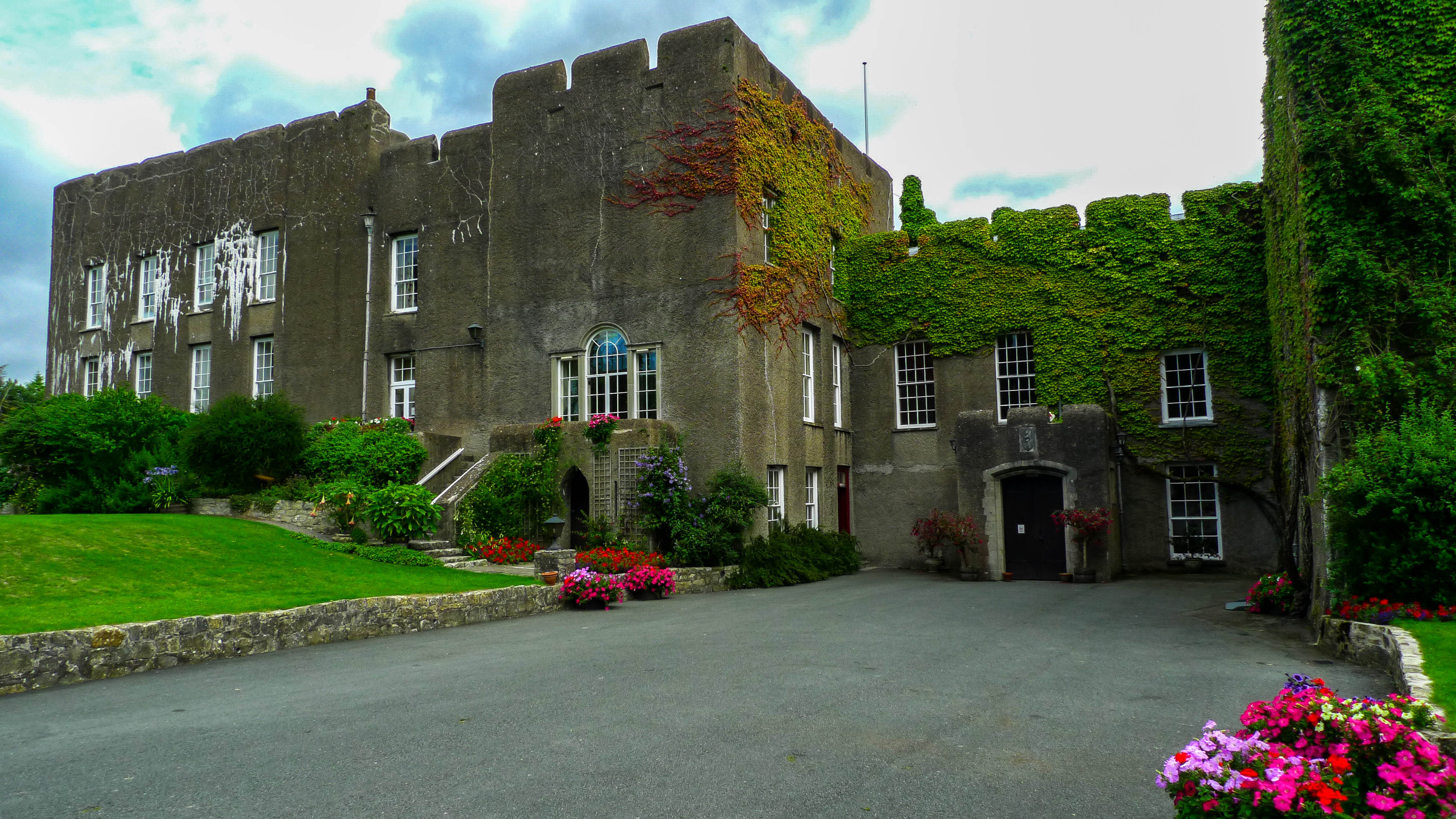
- Fonmon Castle in 2013

Site information
- Type: Historic house museum
- Owner: Private
- Website: Fonmon Castle

Location
- Location within the Vale of Glamorgan
- Location within Vale of Glamorgan
- Coordinates: 51.4037°N 3.3708°W

Fonmon Castle (Welsh: Castell Ffwl-y-mwn) is a fortified medieval castle near the village of Fonmon in the Vale of Glamorgan and a Grade I listed building. The castle's gardens are designated Grade II on the Cadw/ICOMOS Register of Parks and Gardens of Special Historic Interest in Wales. With its origins rooted in the 12th century it is today seen as a great architectural rarity, as it is one of few buildings that was drastically remodelled in the 18th century, but not Gothicized. The castle is believed to have remained under the ownership of just two families throughout its history; from Norman times, it was owned by the St Johns, and from 1656, by the descendants of Colonel Philip Jones.

== History ==
The origins of Fonmon Castle are poorly documented and most of its early history has been discovered through studying its architecture. A popular myth exists that the castle was built by Oliver St John of Fonmon, one of the Twelve Knights of Glamorgan who effected the Norman conquest of Glamorgan. It has since been shown that this was a legendary tale given credence by a "historic" story in the 1560s by Sir Edward Stradling.

There is speculation that a defensive fortification made of timber was built on the site of Fonmon Castle soon after the Norman invasion of Wales, with stonework added around 1200. The thick walls to the left of the entrance is easily identifiable as 12th century in design, and shows the existence of a rectangular keep. This keep was relatively small in size, approximately 8 m × 13 m. In the 13th century a curtain wall was added to the east side of the keep leading towards a steep scarp. This was followed by a much larger L-shaped build to the south with a south-east tower added at the angle. The east wall along the ravine edge has the castle's thickest walls, which is a curiosity as this would have been the most difficult side to attack. It is therefore believed that some other defensive structure may have existed to protect the more vulnerable south and west approaches. These early constructions are thought to have been undertaken by the St. John family (see Viscounts Bolingbroke), who were associated with the castle during the Middle Ages and continued as owners until 1656. It was not until the 16th century that the next major addition was made, a short north wing built over a barrel-vaulted semi-basement.

The St John family were connected to the Tudor dynasty by Oliver St John's marriage (around 1394–1437) to Margaret Beauchamp, grandmother of Henry VII.

The castle survived being damaged during the English Civil War, with the St. John family supporting the Parliamentarians, but soon afterwards they fell into financial difficulties and had to sell their estates in Glamorgan, and the castle was sold to a Parliamentarian officer Colonel Philip Jones. It is believed that Jones then improved the rooms on the east range, and added a double-depth wing to the north side. However Jones retired from public life at the Restoration. Upon Jones' death, the castle passed to his son Oliver, who owned the castle from 1678 to 1685.

Philip Jones' grandson, Robert Jones I, added a notable collection of paintings, including a portrait of the family by William Hogarth, now in the National Museum in Cardiff. Oliver's great-grandson, Robert Jones III (1738–93), made the next major redevelopment to the castle. He married Jane Seys, heiress to the Seys of Boverton, and in 1762 they began improvements, employing Thomas Paty of Bristol. They added render, and made additions the battlements to give it more of an appearance of a castle. The ceiling of the library, by the Bristol plasterer Thomas Stocking, is considered "the best rococo plasterwork in Wales".

The estate went into a period of decline in the 19th century, and little work was done on the castle except for the addition of the entrance porch, and the extension to the south wing between 1840 and 1878. With the end of the Jones dynasty, the castle passed by marriage to Sir Seymour Boothby, one of the Boothby baronets, in 1917. In 2019, Nigel Ford acquired the castle and some 350 acres (140 hectares) of the remaining estate. Amongst several other initiatives, a forward-thinking and extensive "wilding" project has commenced in an effort to improve the biodiversity of the area.

The park as of 2024 is also now home to True Aim Activities, hosting archery, axe throwing and nature-based activities.

=== Archaeology ===
In early 2024, a cemetery from the 6th or 7th century was uncovered in a field on the castle grounds. As of 2025, the graves of 39 adults and 2 children have been excavated. Most of the skeletons are female and some of the graves contain shards of pottery and fine etched glass.

Further excavation uncovered evidence of an Iron Age settlement. The skeleton of a dog, radiocarbon-dated to 700–500 BC, was found placed intentionally in the entrance ditch of this settlement, perhaps as a symbolic guardian.

== Architecture ==
=== Exterior ===
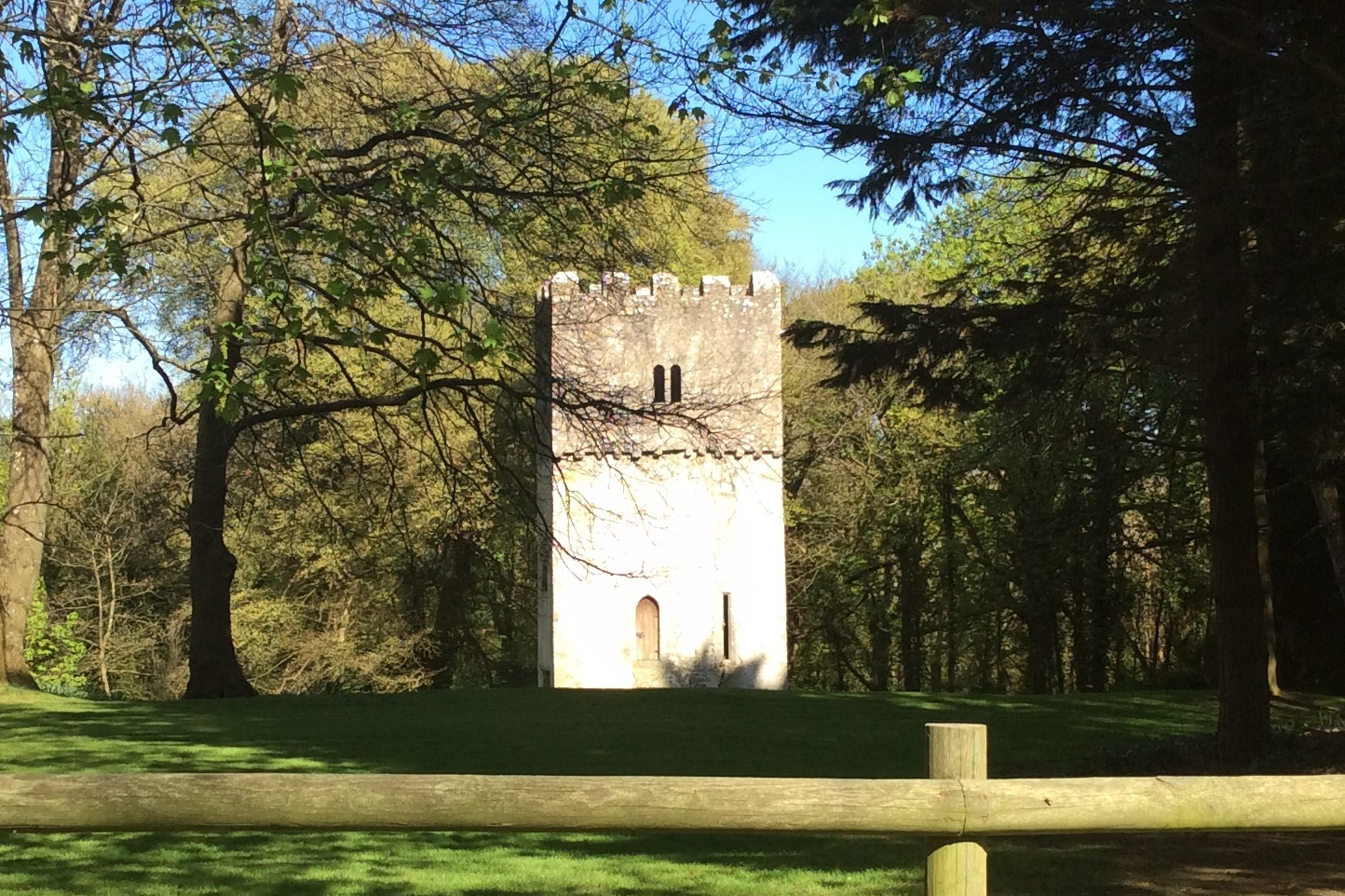
The watchtower at Fonmon Castle

Fonmon Castle is situated in extensive gardens which are designated Grade II on the Cadw/ICOMOS Register of Parks and Gardens of Special Historic Interest in Wales. It is constructed of local sourced stone, primarily limestone and blue lias rubble. There is one arched internal doorway which appears to be Sutton stone; but are covered in grey render which disguises much of the stonework. The roofs are of mixed slates with lead gutters and dressings. The main building is of two and three storeys and castellated almost throughout. Apart from the south east corner tower, which is slightly higher, the walls are largely uniform in height.

=== Interior ===
Notable features include the combined grand drawing room and library, designed by Thomas Stocking. Described by Newman as the "glory of Fonmon", the library, running east to west is lit by two Venetian windows, a stone one to the west wall and a sashed timber oriel window to the east. The room is divided into three sections, the largest central, with square end bays with segmental arches. There are trophies of the chase in the spandrels of the arches and arabesques and wreaths adorn the flat of the ceiling with an Apollo head in a sunburst at its centre.

=== Stables ===
In the grounds, to the southwest of the house, there is an 18th-century stable block which incorporates a late medieval barn. The south and east walls of the stable are castellated to impress those approaching from the south. The stable has a fine polygonal stone chimney, which is a rare surviving medieval find, taken from East Orchard Farm, St Athan. The Joneses acquired East Orchard Farm in 1756, but abandoned the building after stripping it of its dressed stonework.

=== Watchtower ===
Further south is a battlemented watch tower of either 17th or 18th century design, thought to have been modelled on the one found at St Donats. It is believed the watch tower was constructed in two builds, and may have been founded on original ruined medieval stonework. Although it appears to be of 16th century design, it does not appear on the estate plan of 1622, but does appear on the plans of 1770 giving a wide window for its construction date. Due to its time scale and features, it is assumed to have been constructed during the medievalizing improvements carried out by Robert Jones III. It is constructed of local roughly coursed limestone rubble, which has been lime-plastered. It was given Grade II* listed building status in 1952, with the reason given "an interesting example of a C16 and late C18 look-out tower and for its group value within the gardens of Fonmon Castle".
