= Margaret Casson =

British architect (1913–1999)

- Born: Margaret MacDonald; 26 September 1913; Pretoria, South Africa
- Died: 12 November 1999 (aged 86); London, England
- Education: Bartlett School of Architecture
- Occupations: architect, designer and photographer
- Spouse: Sir Hugh Casson (m. 1938)
- Children: 3

Margaret Casson, Lady Casson (26 September 1913 – 12 November 1999) was an architect, designer and photographer, and the wife of the architect Hugh Casson.

== Life ==
Margaret Macdonald Troup (Note: Her maiden name is given as Macdonald by some sources; "Macdonald" is sometimes given as "MacDonald".) was born in Pretoria, South Africa, on 26 September 1913. Her father, James MacDonald Troup, was a doctor and later advisor to Jan Smuts; her mother was Alberta, née Davis. The Arts and Crafts architect and designer Francis William Troup was her great-uncle. She was educated at Wychwood School, Oxford, and then attended the Bartlett School of Architecture of University College, London, one of few women to do so at that time. She married the architect Hugh Casson on 19 November 1938, with whom she had three daughters.

== Career ==
Margaret Casson's first job, from 1937 to 1938, was in the office of the Modernist architect Kit Nicholson, son of the painter Sir William Nicholson and brother of Ben and Nancy Nicholson, where Nicholson's wife EQ and his student and protégé Hugh Casson also worked.

In 1938 and 1939 she was in private practice in South Africa, but returned to England at the start of the Second World War. From 1946 to 1951 she worked as a designer for Cockade Ltd., and in 1952 took up a post as senior tutor at the Royal College of Art, where her husband Hugh was a professor. She remained there until 1974, and in 1980 was made a senior fellow. In 1985 she was made an honorary fellow of the Royal Academy, where her husband was president. She held advisory posts at several public organisations, among them the Design Council from 1967 to 1973, London Transport from 1980 to 1988, and the Post Office from 1980 to 1985.

Late in life, Margaret Casson experimented with what she called shadow drawings or "sciagrams", photographs made either with or without a camera; some were platinum–palladium prints. These she exhibited under the name Margaret Macdonald in London, in 1994 at the Akehurst Gallery, in 1998 at the City Gallery and in 2000 at the Fine Art Society; in Bath, at the Royal Photographic Society; in Japan, at the MIN Gallery, Tokyo; and the United States, at the Forbes Magazine Galleries and at the Bertha Urdang Gallery in New York.

Margaret Casson died in London on 12 November 1999, less than three months after the death of her husband. The service of thanksgiving already planned for him at St. Paul's Cathedral on 29 November 1999 became a memorial to them both.
