= EQ Nicholson =

British painter and textile designer (1908–1992)

- Self-portrait in wax crayon and coloured ink, about 1943 (detail)
- Born: Elsie Queen Myers; 4 November 1908; London, England
- Died: 7 September 1992 (aged 83); London
- Known for: painting, textile design
- Spouse: Christopher "Kit" Nicholson (m. 1931; died 1948)

EQ Nicholson (4 November 1908 – 7 September 1992) was a British painter and textile designer.

== Early life ==
Elsie Queen Myers was born in London on 4 November 1908, the daughter of the novelist Leo Myers and his American-born wife Elsie Mellen Palmer; her sister Eveleen was born in 1910. Her paternal grandparents were the writer Frederic W. H. Myers and the photographer Eveleen Tennant; her maternal grandfather was General William Jackson Palmer of Delaware, from whose wife Mary "Queen" Palmer, née Mellen, she received her second name.

Leo Myers frequented writers and artists including members of the Bloomsbury Group, the sculptor Frank Dobson and the painter Cedric Morris. He committed suicide on 7 April 1944 by taking an overdose of Veronal.

In 1931, EQ married the architect Christopher "Kit" Nicholson, youngest son of the painters William Nicholson and Mabel Pryde, and brother to Ben Nicholson and Nancy Nicholson. During the Second World War EQ and her children lived at first at Yew Cottage on Cranborne Chase in Dorset, and then, from 1941 until 1947, at Alderholt Mill House, near Fordingbridge in Hampshire. Kit Nicholson died of injuries following a glider crash in Italy on 28 July 1948.

EQ died in London in 1992.

== Career ==
EQ studied under Henry Tonks at the Slade School of Fine Arts for a few weeks in about 1926, and then spent two years in Paris, where she studied the technique of batik. She later worked as an assistant to the designer Marion Dorn. She also designed rugs. When she was twenty she designed the interior of the new family home at Leckhampton House in Cambridge.

After her marriage, she worked in Nicholson's Modernist architecture practice, where his student and protégé Hugh Casson and his wife Margaret also worked. EQ designed the interiors of Nicholson's building for the London Gliding Club at Dunstable in 1936.

From about 1936 until 1950, EQ worked with her sister-in-law Nancy Nicholson, who had already printed textile designs both for her brother Ben Nicholson and for his wife Barbara Hepworth at her Poulk Press. EQ's designs from this time include Black Goose (1936), Daisy and Seaweed (1949). Some of these designs were later screen-printed by Edinburgh Weavers. One of her best-known designs is Runner Bean, which dates from about 1950 and was used in Hugh Casson's furnishing of the Royal Yacht and for hand-printed wallpapers by Cole & Son. The archive of the Whitworth Art Gallery, Manchester, includes a collection of EQ's drawings and textiles. Some of her designs are still being commercially produced.

For a period of only about fifteen years from about 1941, EQ worked intensely as a painter, in gouache, crayon and collage, in a style that owed something to Georges Braque, whom she greatly admired. She had one show, jointly with Peter Rose Pulham and Keith Vaughan, at the Hanover Gallery in 1950. Works from this period are in the Tate, the New Hall Art Collection and the National Portrait Gallery; they have been compared to those of other artist-designers such as Edward Bawden and Eric Ravilious.
