= Margaret Lucy Lee =

English educator (1871 – 1955)

- Born: 14 July 1871; Hartley Wintney
- Died: 26 December 1955 (aged 84); Oxford
- Education: St Hugh's College, Oxford
- Occupations: Lecturer in Old English and Middle English; headmistress
- Employer(s): St Hugh's College, Oxford, Society of Oxford Home Students, King's College for Women, University College, Reading
- Known for: Co-founder of Wychwood School

Margaret Lucy Lee (1871 – 1955) was an English academic and school founder. She taught Anglo-Saxon and Middle English at several institutions at the University of Oxford and elsewhere, and co-founded Wychwood School in 1897.

== Early life and education ==
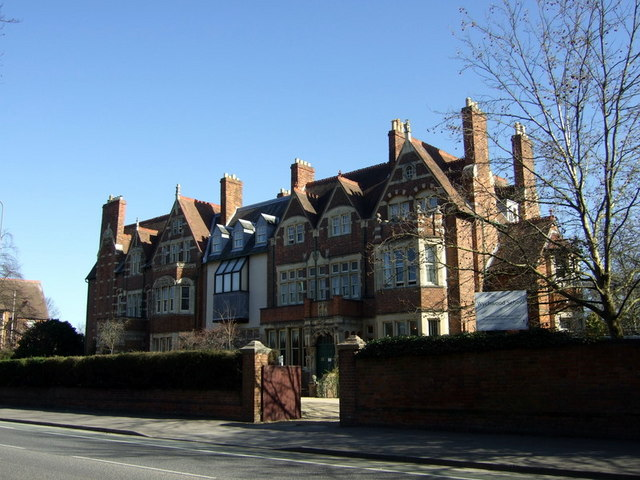
The current premises of Wychwood School, which it moved to in 1918

Margaret Lucy Lee, known as Lucy, was born in Hartley Wintney on 14 July 1871, daughter of Thomas William Lee, later vicar of Leafield, and of Margaret Anne, née Lyon. She was educated by her mother and by governesses, and attended a girls' school in Warrington Crescent in 1888–9.

In 1892, she earned a first in English with St Hugh's College, Oxford. She did not receive a degree until 1920, when the first degrees were awarded to women at the university, and Lee and some of her colleagues were awarded degrees by decree.

Lee remained at Oxford to produce an edition of Narcissus, a Twelfe Night Merriment. She also produced a Basque grammar and a glossary for a Gothic grammar by Joseph Wright.

== Adult education career ==
After teaching for two years at her former school at Warrington Crescent, Lee was appointed vice-principal of St Hugh's from 1895–6. She held posts as lecturer in Middle English for the Association for Promoting the Education of Women in Oxford from 1897, and lecturer and tutor in Anglo-Saxon to the Society of Oxford Home Students, later St Anne's College, from 1913–1926.

Lee also held teaching posts at other universities. She taught pupils including Edith Morley and Caroline Spurgeon at King's College for Women, London, from 1898–1919, and lectured at University College, Reading, from 1915–1926.

== Wychwood School ==
In 1897, Lee co-founded Wychwood School in Oxford with her former teacher and colleague at Warrington Crescent, Annie Sophia Batty. The school began with one pupil, Margaret Gay, and was at first known as Miss Batty and Miss Lee's School before taking its name from Wychwood. Early pupils included the writers Joan Aiken, Joanna and May Cannan, and Carola Oman; another future writer, Margiad Evans, worked as Lee's housekeeper. She remained co-principal until 1954. The school offers a Lee Scholarship in Margaret's name.

Lee died at her home in Oxford on 26 December 1955.
