= Wychwood School =

Girls' school in Oxford, Oxfordshire, England

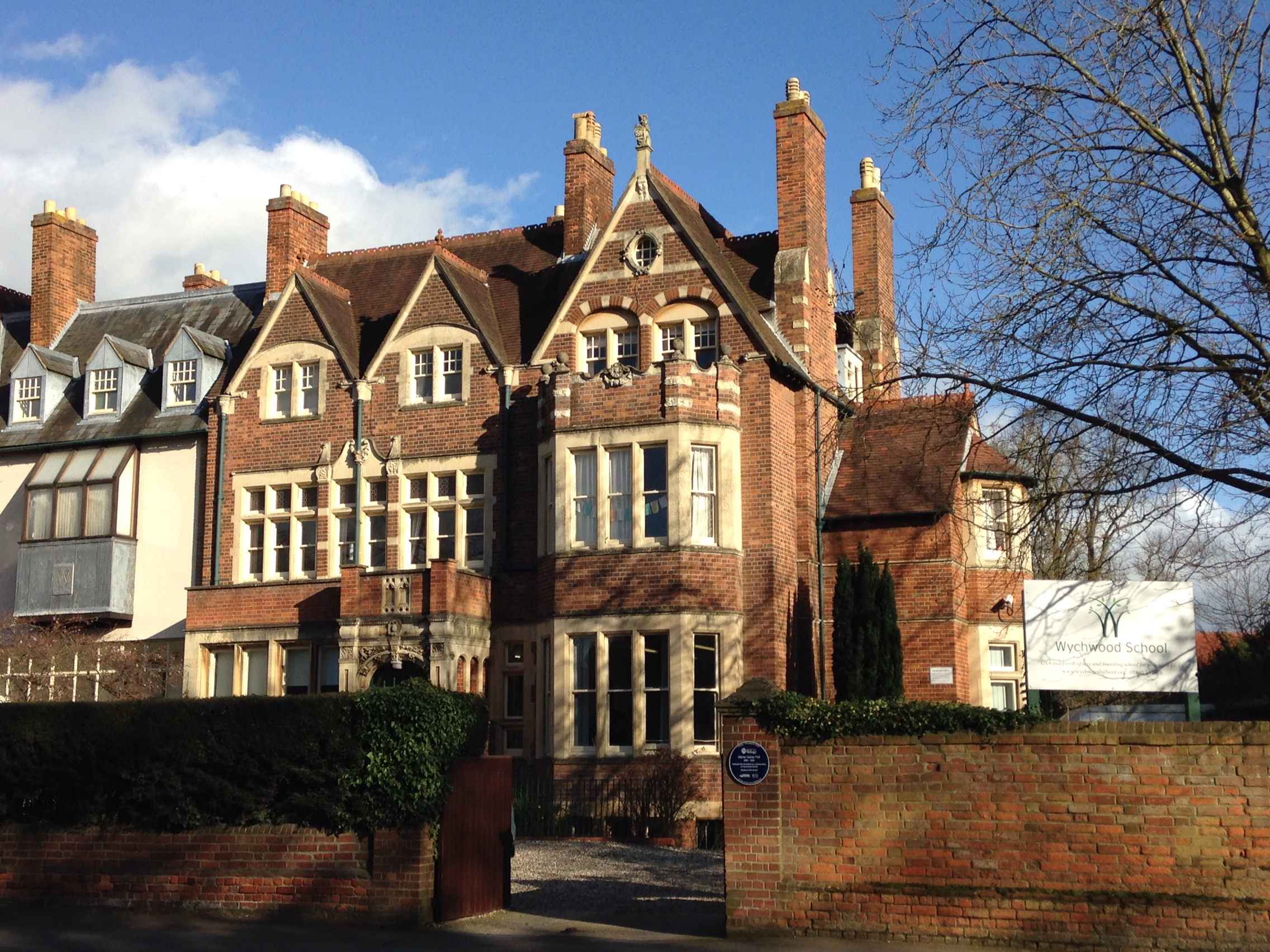
- View of the school from Banbury Road

Location
- 74 Banbury Road; Oxford, Oxfordshire, OX2 6JR; England; 51.766923°N 1.261058°W

Information
- Type: Private day and boarding school
- Religious affiliation: Church of England
- Established: 1897
- Local authority: Oxfordshire County Council
- Head teacher: Jane Evans
- Age: 11 to 18
- Enrolment: 120
- Website: wychwoodschool.org

Wychwood School is a co-educational private day and boarding school for pupils aged 11–18, located in Oxford, Oxfordshire, England. The school is a member of the Girls' Schools Association and is owned by Albion Schools and Wychwood School Charity Ltd (No. 309684). The school is located on the southern corner of Bardwell Road and Banbury Road in North Oxford.

== History ==
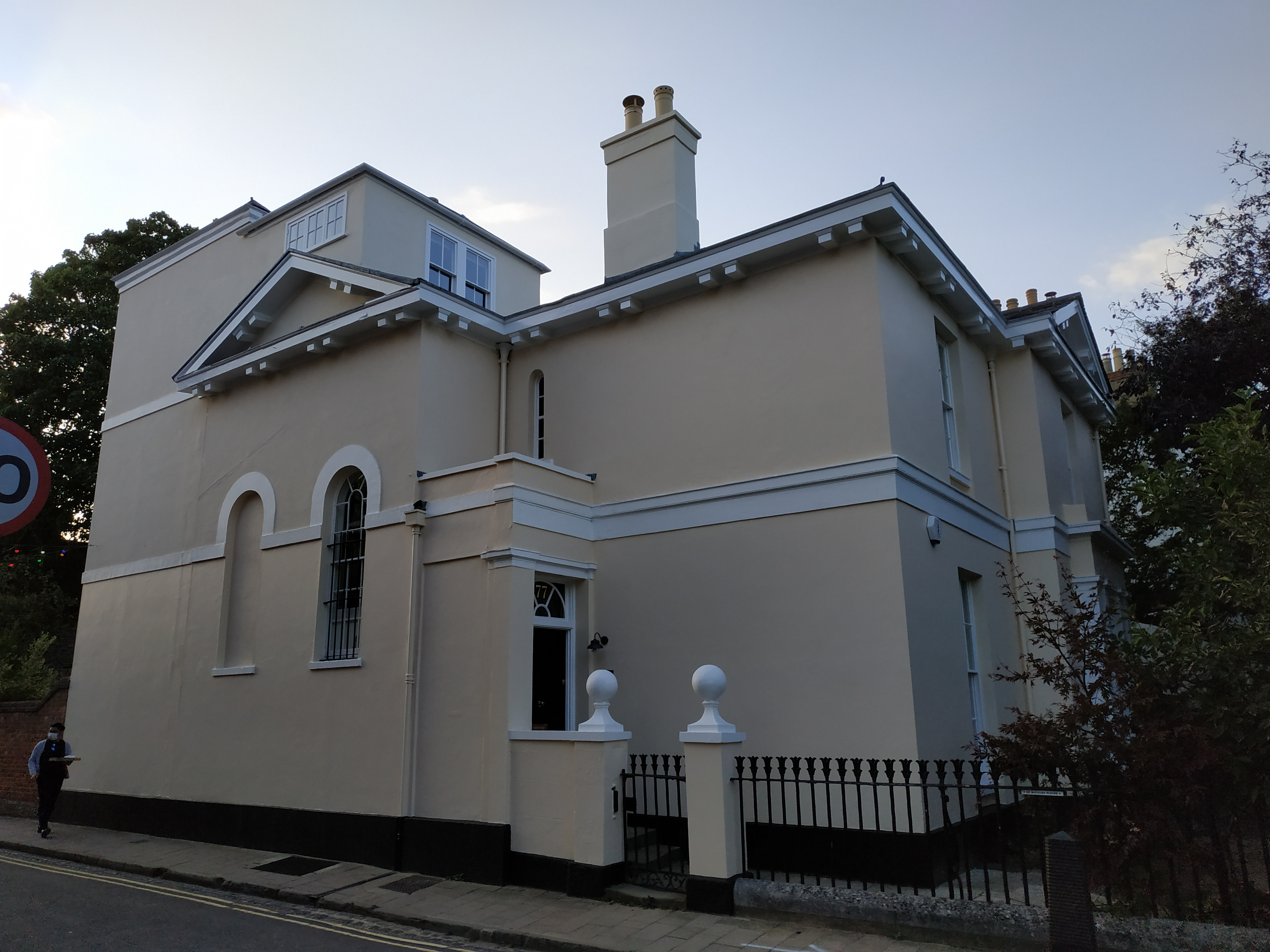
Wychwood School was housed in the Regency-styled 77 Banbury Road from 1898-1918

The school was established in 1897 at 41 Banbury Road in North Oxford with one pupil under Miss Batty and Miss Margaret Lucy Lee. It moved to 77 Banbury Road with seven pupils in 1898.

The first boarders were accepted in 1912. The school moved to 74 Banbury Road in 1918. Miss Snodgrass became the Headmistress in 1941 and introduced the Dalton System of learning. The school became an educational trust in 1952. Weekly boarding started in 1985.

A blue plaque was installed by the Society of Biology in 2015 on the wall outside the school on Banbury Road recording that the biologist Dame Honor Fell DBE, FRS (1900–1986) studied at the school.

In 2018, Wychwood School was listed among the most expensive schools in Oxfordshire, charging boarders £24,300 a year. In October 2020, the school secured investment from Simon Tyrell, head of a Hong Kong–based property company.

Wychwood became co-educational as of September 2023.

== Alumnae ==
The following were or are alumnae of the school:

- Joan Aiken MBE (1924–2004), writer.
- Margaret Casson (Lady Casson) (1913–1999), architect, designer, photographer, and wife of architect Sir Hugh Casson.
- Ann Dally (1926–2007), doctor, psychiatrist and author (expelled from Wychwood)
- Dame Honor Fell DBE, FRS (1900–1986), zoologist.
- Angela Flowers (née Holland, 1932–2023), gallerist
- Dame Henrietta Miriam Ottoline Leyser DBE FRS (born 1965), plant biologist
- Carola Oman CBE (1897–1978), historical novelist, biographer, and children's writer.
- Rozsika Parker (1945–2010), psychotherapist, art historian, writer, and feminist.
- Florence Pugh (born 1996), actress.
- Nancy Sandars FSA, FBA (1914–2015), archaeologist and prehistorian.
- Iszi Lawrence (born 1985) broadcaster, comedian and author.
- Jeni Munn (1957-2021) author, motion picture executive producer.
