= Beggarstaffs =

Beggarstaffs J. & W. Beggarstaff
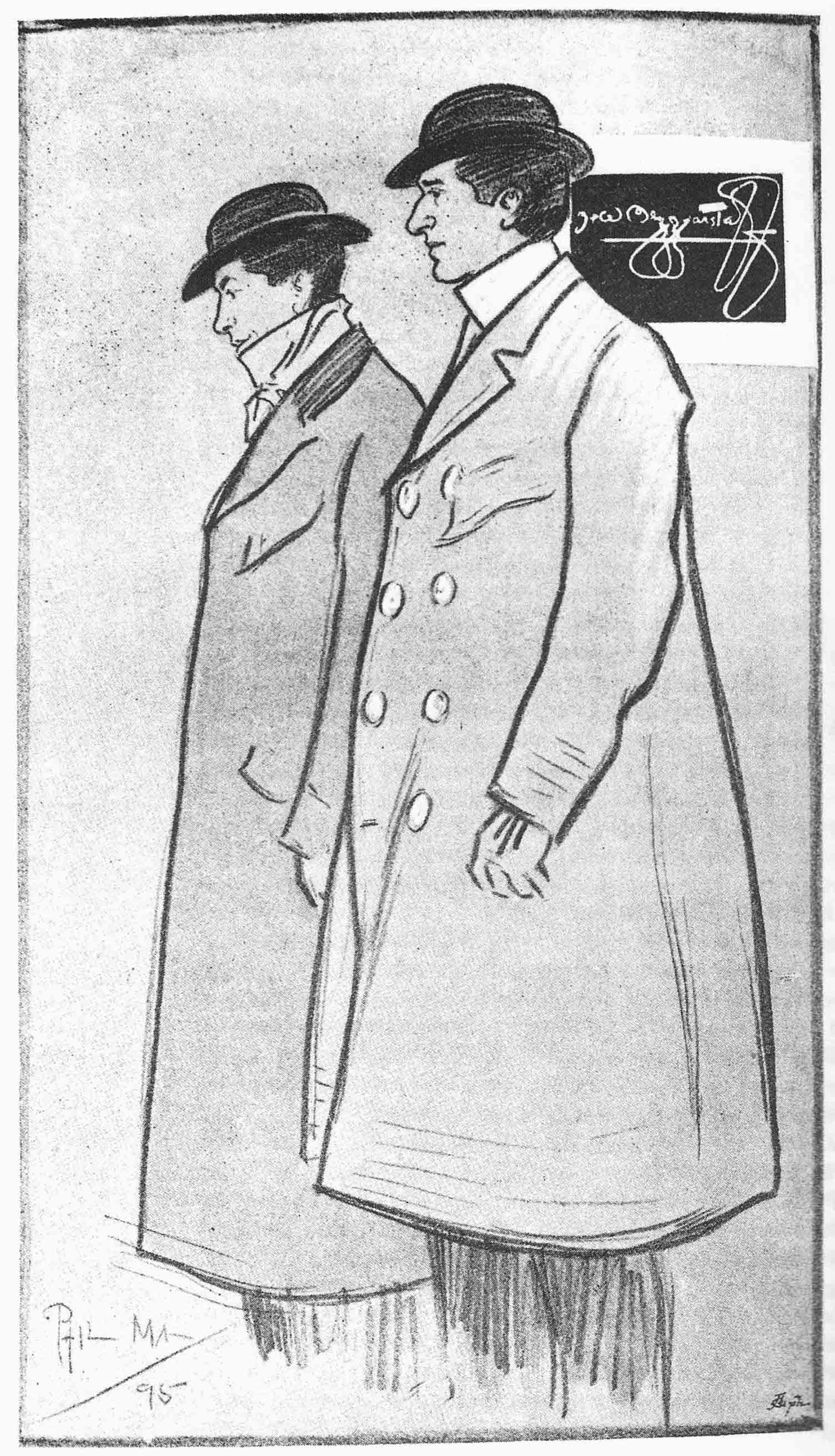
- The Beggarstaffs, drawing of William Nicholson (left) and James Pryde by Phil May (1864–1903), first published in The Studio, September 1895

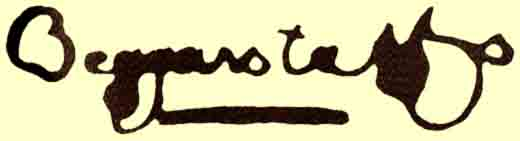
Signature of the Beggarstaffs

The Beggarstaffs, otherwise J. & W. Beggarstaff, was the pseudonym used by the British artists William Nicholson and James Pryde for their collaborative partnership in the design of posters and other graphic work between 1894 and 1899. They are sometimes referred to as the Beggarstaff Brothers, but did not use this name.

== The partnership ==
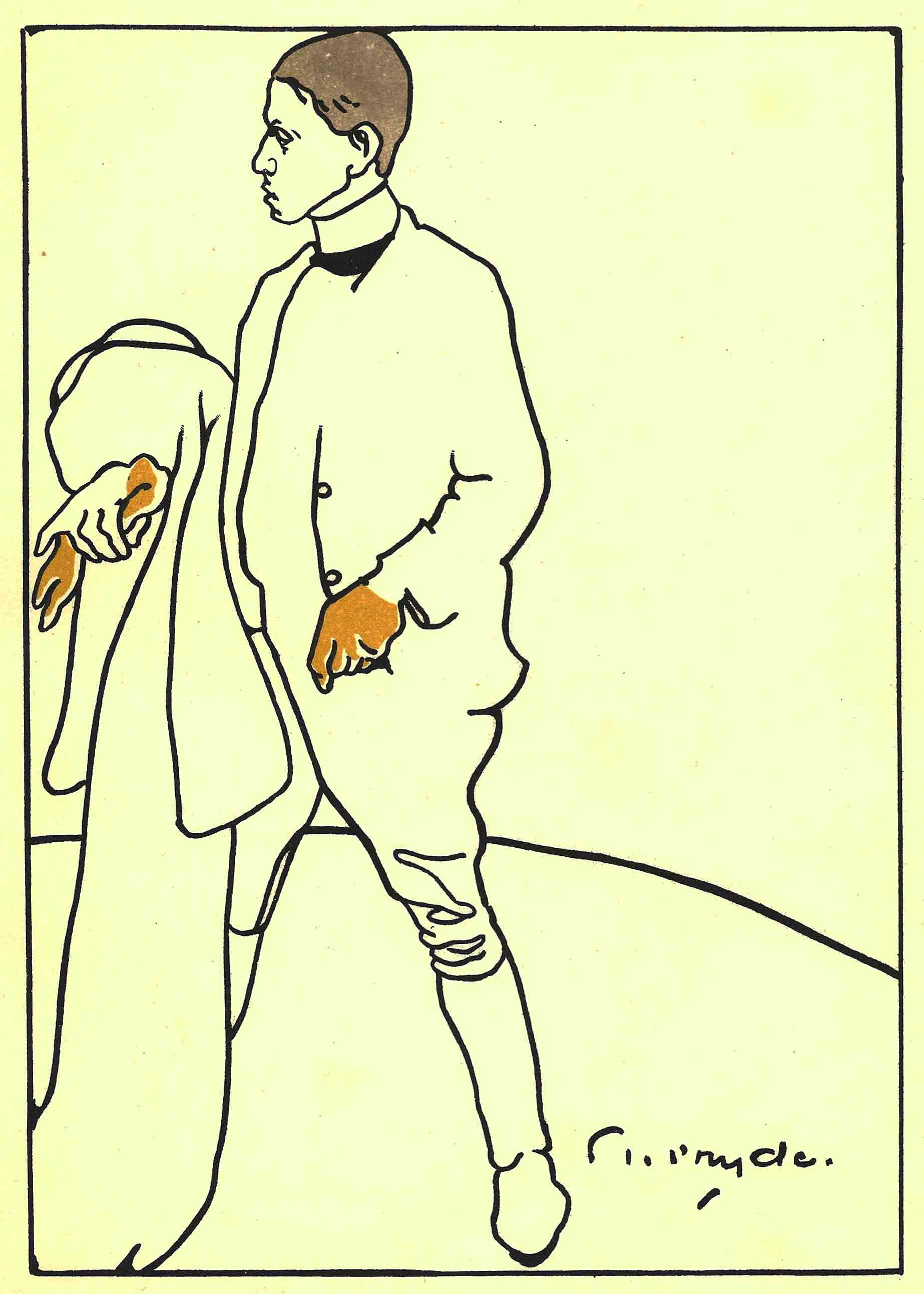
Portrait Study of W.P. Nicholson, lithograph portrait of William Nicholson by James Pryde, published in The Studio, December 1897

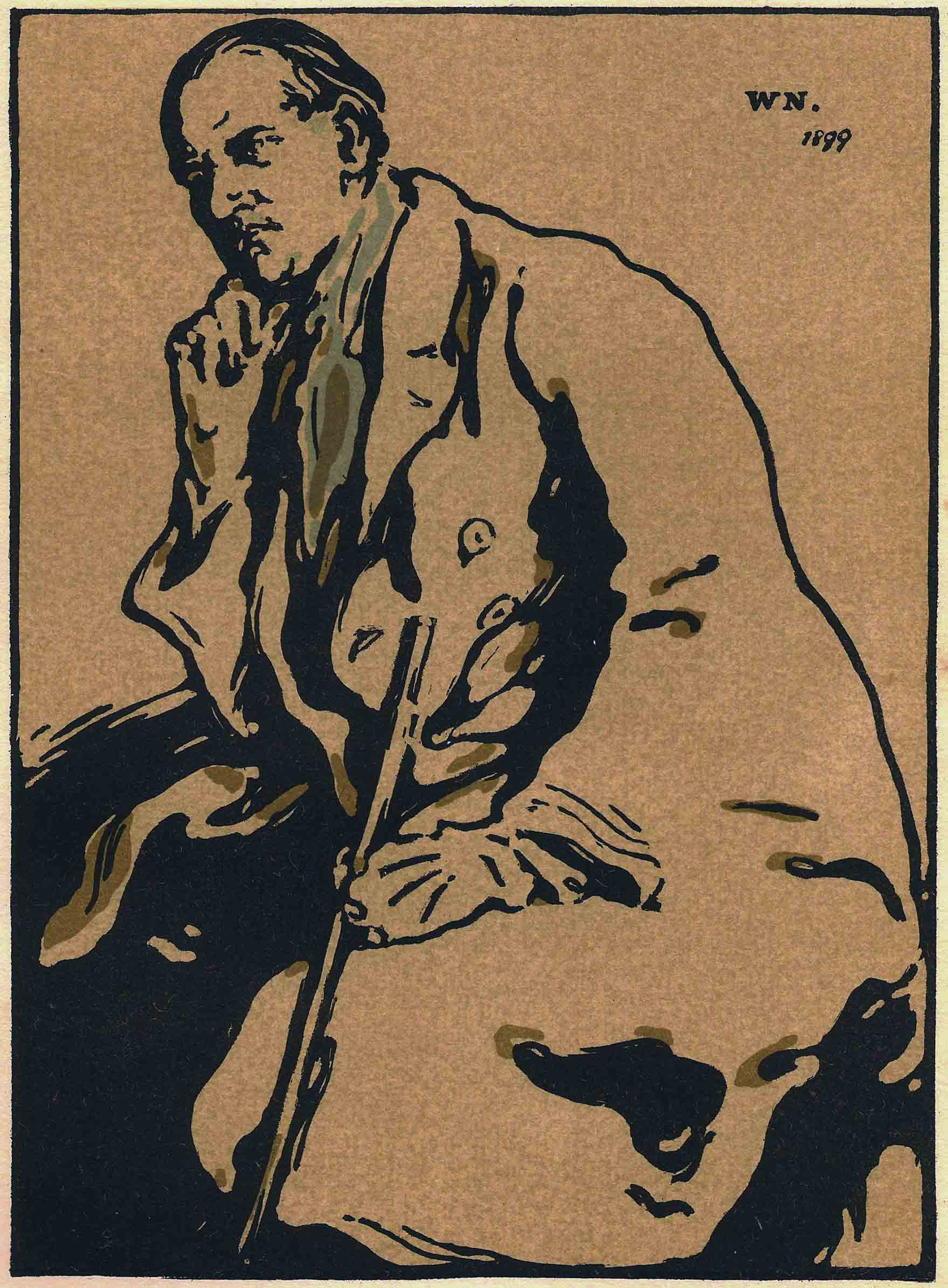
Portrait of James Pryde by William Nicholson, woodcut, 1899; published in The Studio, July 1901

William Nicholson met his future wife Mabel "Prydie" Pryde in 1888 or 1889 at Hubert Herkomer's art school at Bushey, Herts, where both were students. He met her elder brother James, who was also an artist, at about the same time. In 1893, Nicholson and Prydie eloped and were secretly married at Ruislip on 25 April. They went to live in what had been a pub, the Eight Bells at Denham, Bucks. James Pryde soon visited them, and stayed for almost two years. Other visitors to the house included the actor Edward Gordon Craig and his wife May, who had also recently eloped and were living in a cottage in Uxbridge rented from Craig's mother, the famous actress Ellen Terry. In the summer of 1894 Craig was preparing to go on tour with the Shakespearean Company of W.S. Hardy, for whom he was to play, among other roles, that of Hamlet. The part was an important one for him, and he asked Pryde and Nicholson to design and produce a poster to publicise the production. It was their first collaboration.

The initial design was made partly by collage, the hair and clothing of Craig as Hamlet cut from plain black paper; the life-sized figure in the printed version used to publicise the play was stencilled on brown wrapping-paper by Nicholson, with some details added by hand. The original design is untraced; however, it was reproduced in four publications: in the Magazine of Art of January 1895, on page 117; in La Plume of 1 October 1895, on page 427; in Pictorial Posters by Charles Hiatt, published 1895, on page 239; and in The Poster of February 1899, on page 50. No copy of the theatrical poster used to publicise the play is known to survive, but its appearance is known from its publication in Pan in February 1896, on page 333; it has "W.S. Hardy's Company" lettered across the top and is unsigned. Another version of the poster, signed but without the "Hardy's" lettering, may have been produced for sale to collectors. An example is in the Museum of Modern Art of New York City; this version was printed in facsimile in 1898 in Paris by the Imprimerie Chaix as plate 107 of Les Maîtres de l'Affiche.

The last version of the Hamlet poster is signed, by hand, "J. W. Beggarstaff Denham Uxbridge". According to Nicholson, the Beggarstaff pseudonym was chosen after "Pryde and I came across it one day in an old stable, on a sack of fodder"; Pryde gave a similar, though slightly different, explanation.

At about the same time, the Beggarstaffs designed and printed a poster showing Craig in another of his leading rôles on the same tour with Hardy's company, that of Charles Surface in Sheridan's School for Scandal. It also was probably stencilled on brown paper. It does not survive in any form; Craig described it as "absolutely splendid".

The Hamlet poster was shown at the International Artistic Pictorial Poster Exhibition at the Royal Aquarium in Westminster in November 1894.

== Works ==
The works that the Beggarstaffs are known to have made are, according to Campbell:

- Hamlet, poster for W.S. Hardy Shakespeare Co., 1894.
- The School for Scandal, poster for W.S. Hardy Shakespeare Co., 1894. Untraced, appearance unknown.
- Becket, poster design for Henry Irving as Becket, Lyceum Theatre, c. 1894.
- Nobody’s Washing Blue, poster design, 1894. Untraced, appearance unknown.
- Nobody’s Candles, poster design, 1894. Untraced, appearance unknown.
- Nobody’s Niggers, poster design, 1894. Untraced, appearance unknown.
- Nobody’s Pianos, poster design, 1894. Untraced, appearance unknown.
- Kassama Corn Flour, poster for a Glasgow firm, 1894.
- Children Playing, decorative screen, 1895.
- Chinaman, poster design, 1895.
- The Hour Illustrated, contents bill for The Hour Illustrated magazine, 1895.
- Girl Reading, poster design for Macmillan Publishers, 1895. Untraced.
- Don Quixote, poster design for Henry Irving, 1895.
- Roundhead, poster design, 1895. Untraced.
- Harper’s Magazine, poster for Harper's New Monthly Magazine, 1895.
- Coachman, poster design, 1895. Untraced.
- Cinderella, poster for the Artistic Supply Company, 1895.
- Queen Victoria, poster design, 1895. Untraced, appearance unknown.
- Girl and Screen, poster design, 1896. Untraced, appearance unknown.
- Man and Map, poster design, 1896. Untraced, appearance unknown.
- Rowntree’s Elect Cocoa, poster for H.I. Rowntree & Co., 1896.
- The Quiver, poster design for The Quiver poster competition, 1897. Lost, untraced, appearance unknown.
- The Goat, painted signboard for a pub, 1896/7. Untraced, appearance unknown.
- The Black and White Gallery, painted signboard for Louis Meyer, 1897 or later. Untraced, appearance unknown.
- Girl on Horseback, oil painting, 1898. Untraced, appearance unknown.
- Cover design and 10 illustrations for Tony Drum: A Cockney Boy by Edwin Pugh, 1898.
- Robespierre, poster design for Henry Irving, 1899. Unpublished.
- The Coach and Horses, painted signboard, 1900 or later.

The Beggarstaffs were known for their new technique, collage, using cut pieces of paper moved around on a board leaving a figure incomplete for the viewer to decipher. This is shown in the poster for Kassama Corn Flour where only black and yellow is used. They completely ignored the floral trend of art nouveau, which made their work although an artistic success, a financial disaster. One of the posters they lost money on was their most famous poster, Don Quixote, made for Sir Henry Irving's production at the Lyceum Theatre. It was never printed because the client decided, "it had a bad likeness". Incidents like these caused the partnership to split and left each artist to work on their own.

Posters published in Les Maîtres de l'Affiche

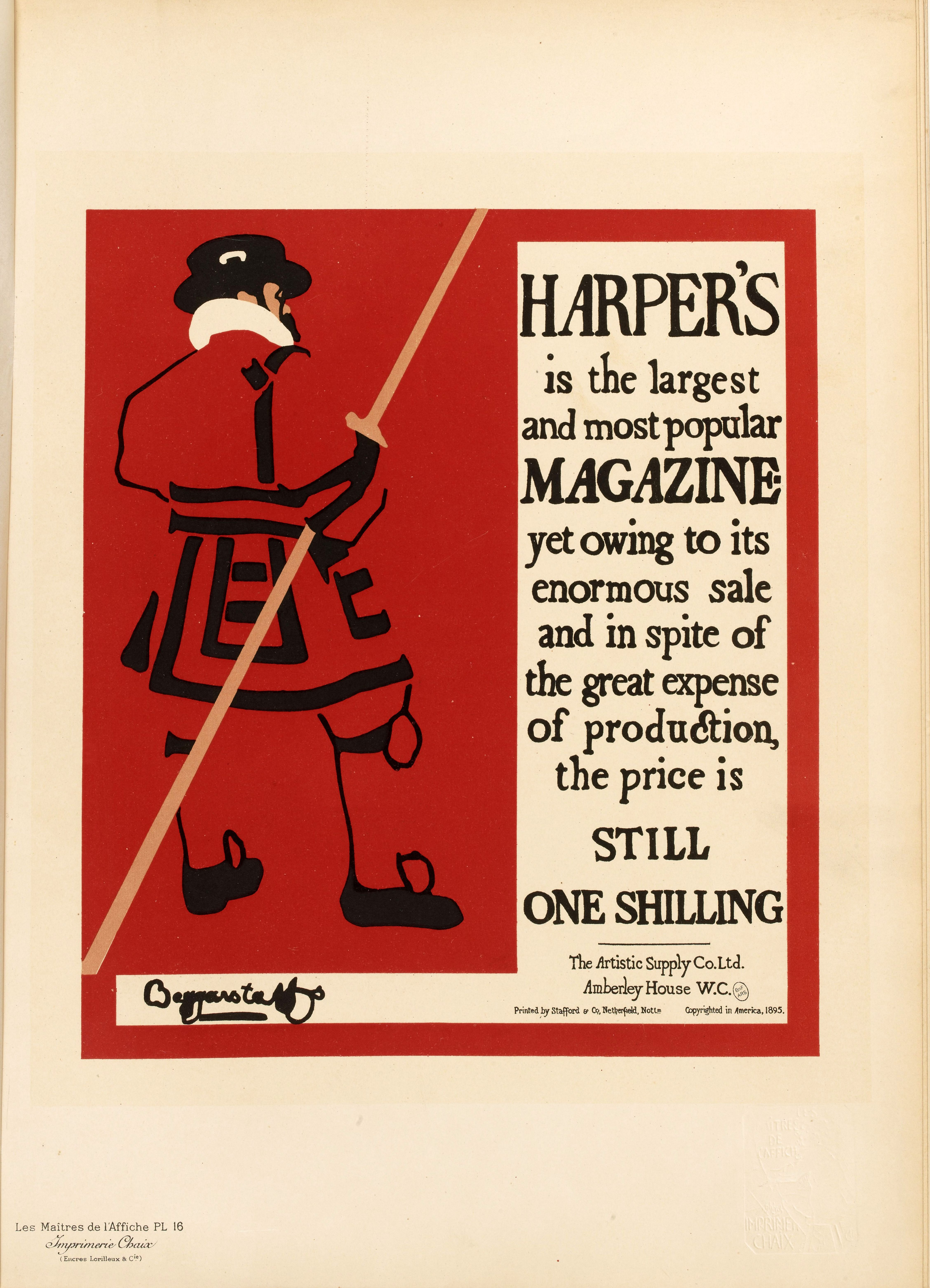
Harper’s Magazine

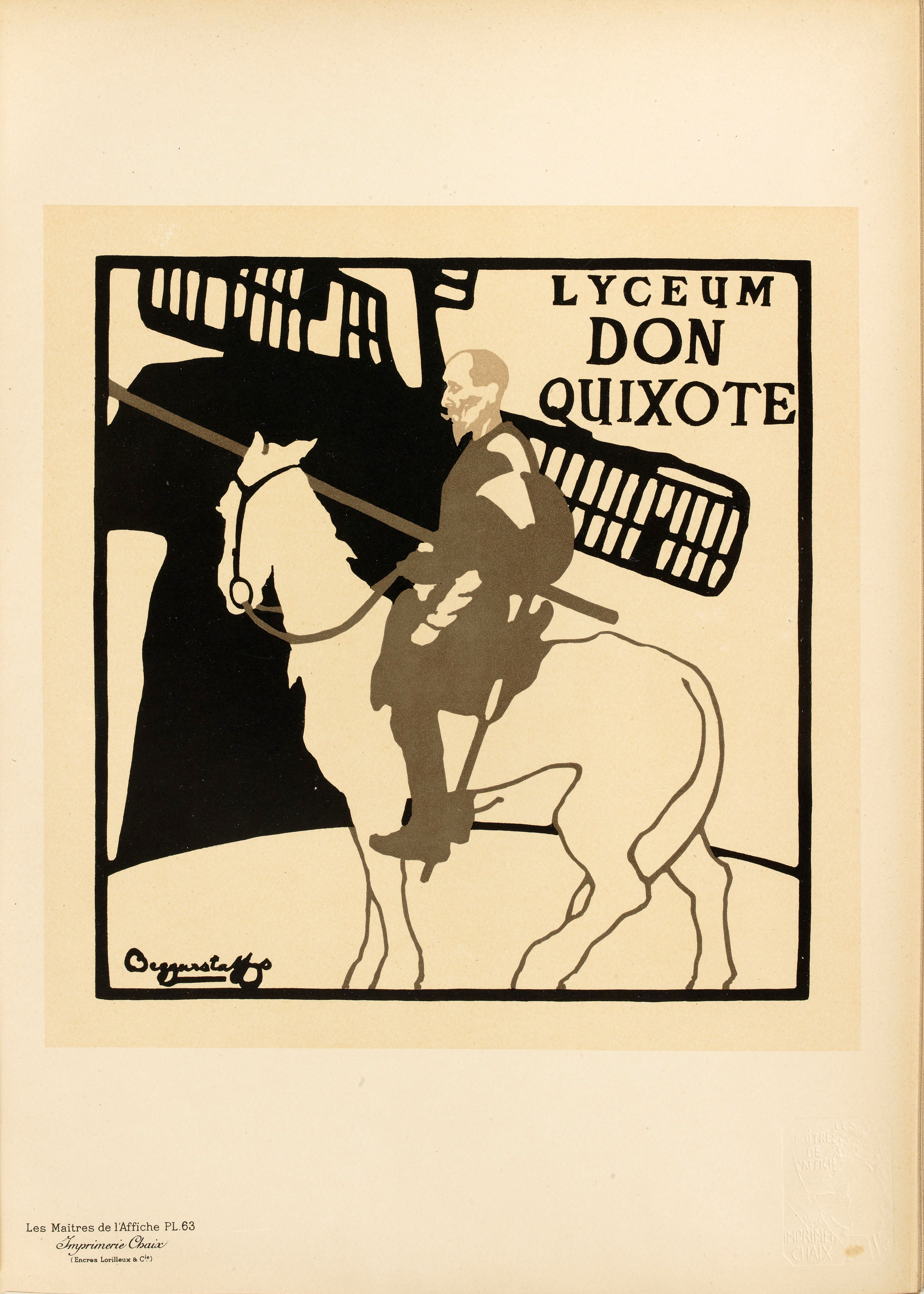
Don Quixote

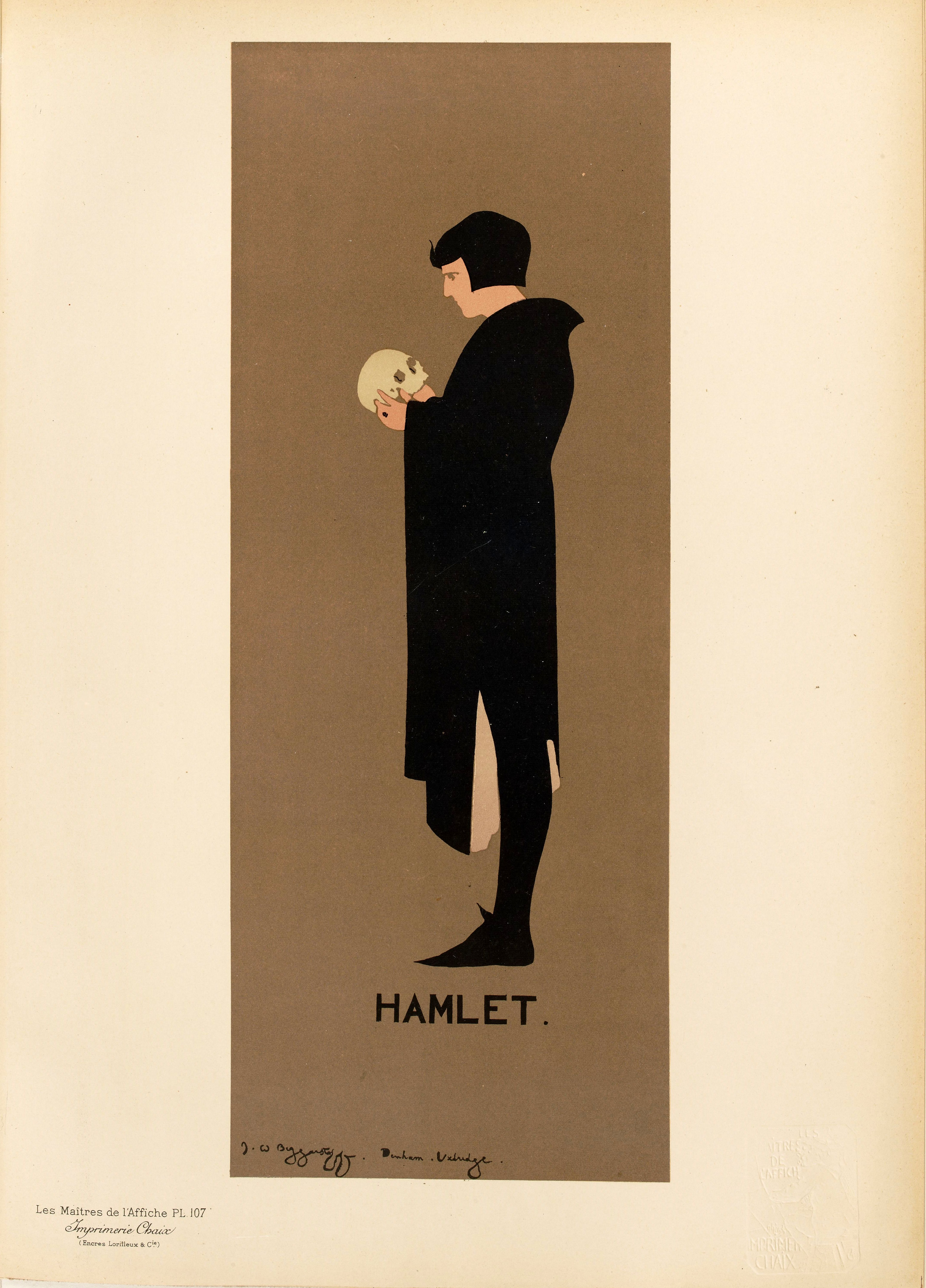
A version of the Hamlet poster not described by Campbell, in the Museum für Kunst und Gewerbe, Hamburg

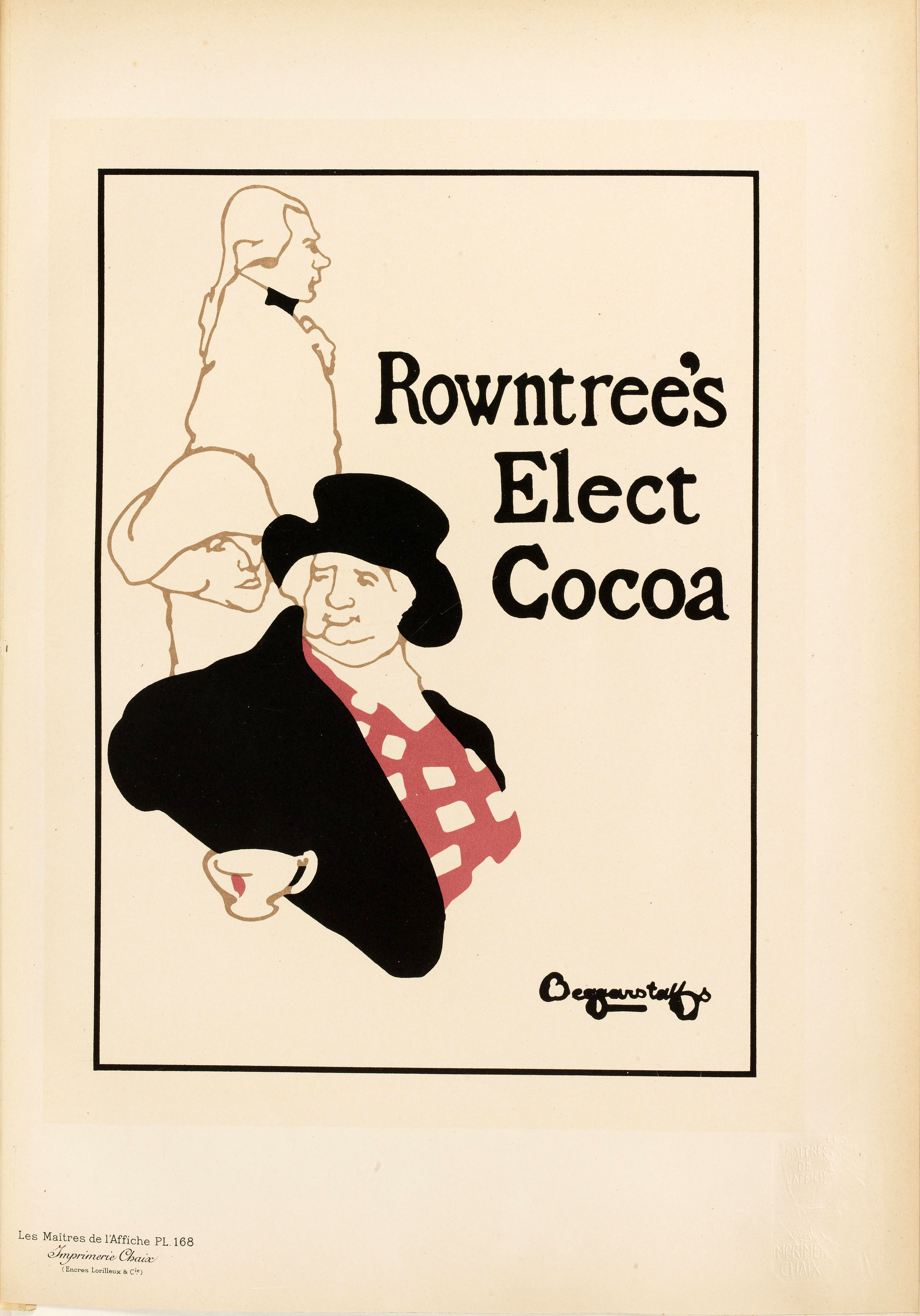
Rowntree's Elect Cocoa

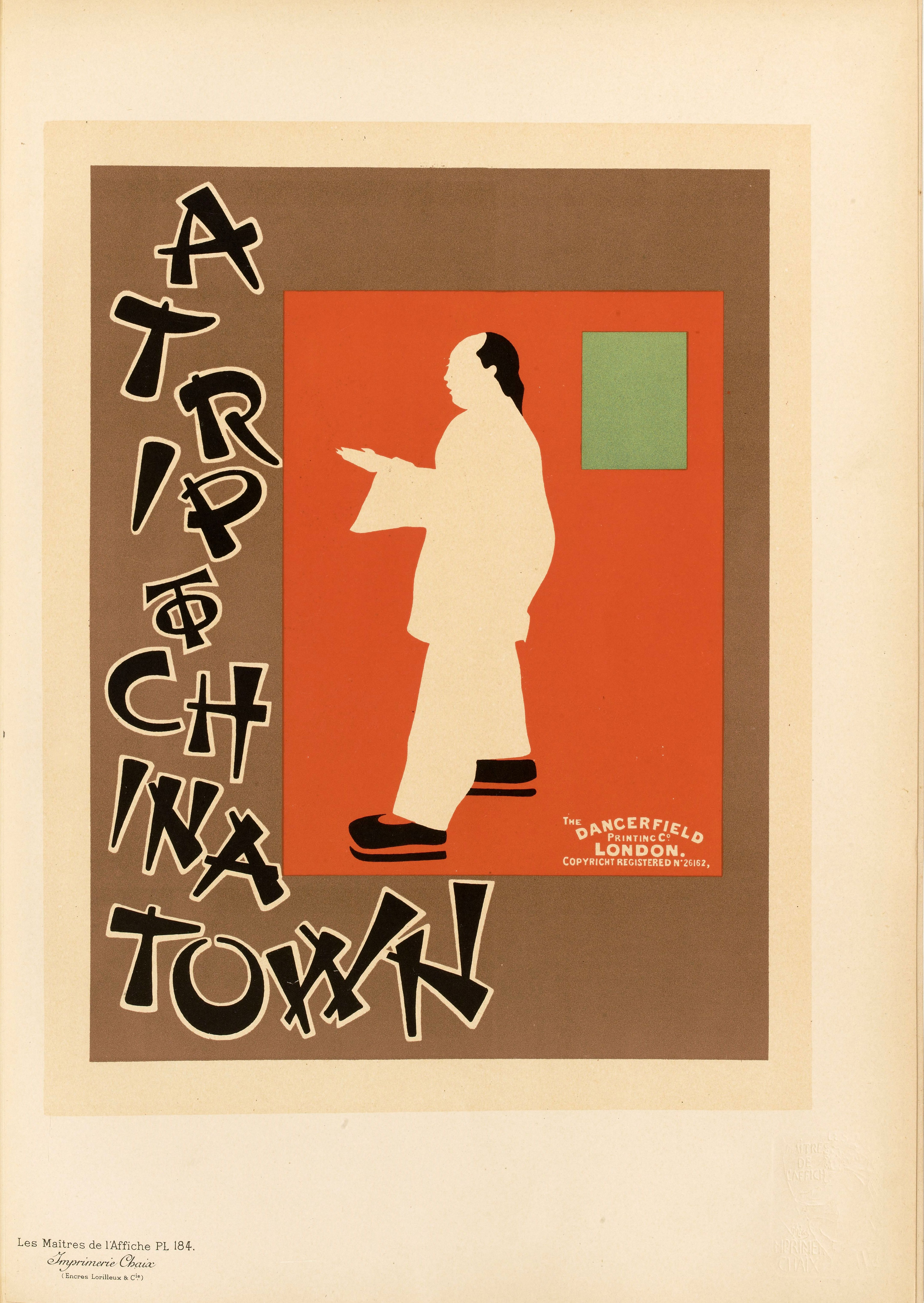
Chinaman

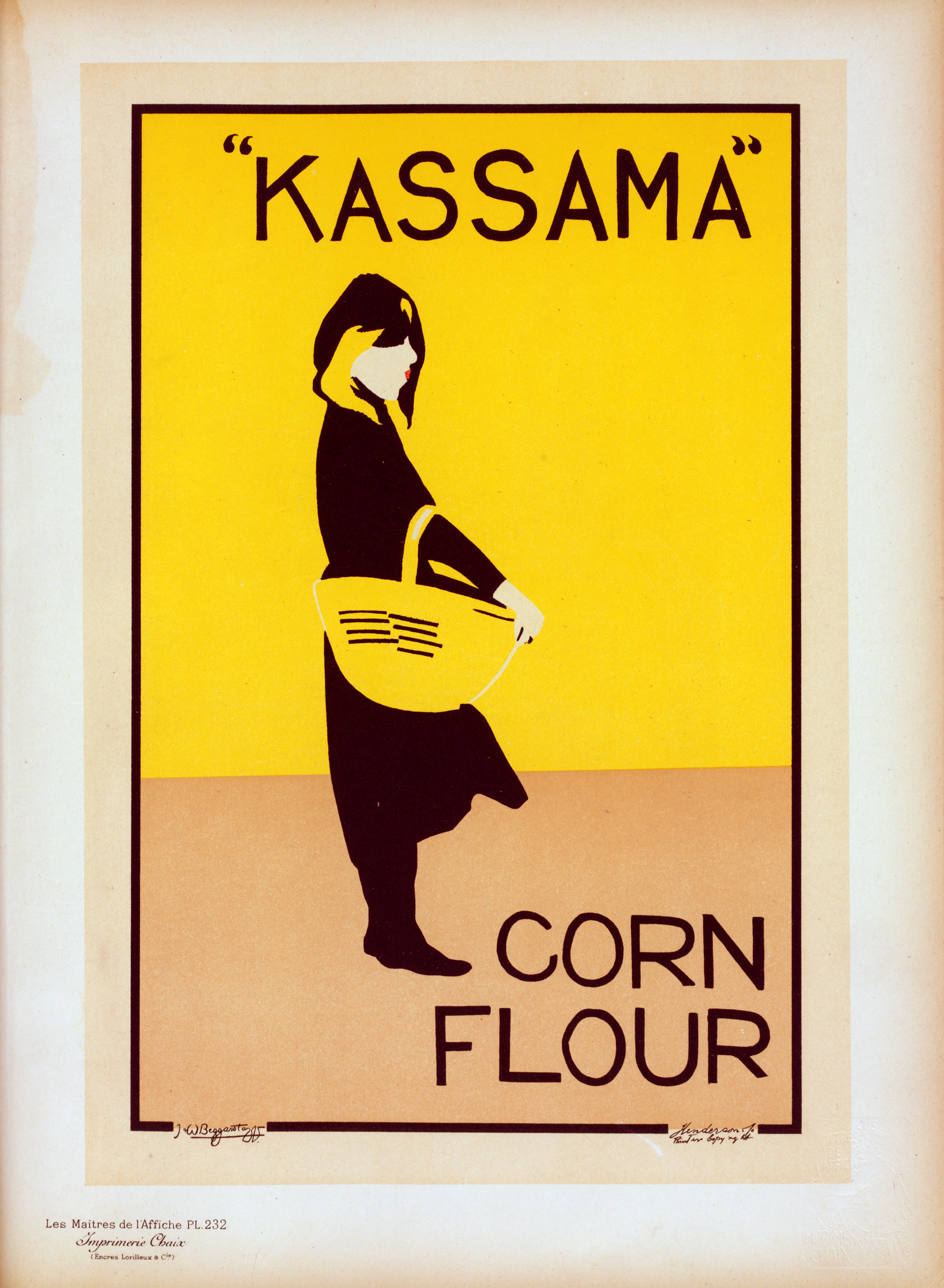
Kassama Corn Flour
