= Kate Nicholson =

English painter (1929–2019)

- Born: July 1929; Bankshead, Brampton, England
- Died: 18 April 2019 (aged 89)
- Education: Bath Academy of Art
- Known for: Painting
- Movement: Penwith Society of Arts
- Parents: Ben Nicholson (father); Winifred Nicholson (mother)
- Relatives: Simon Nicholson (half-brother); Nancy Nicholson (aunt); Christopher Nicholson (uncle); William Nicholson (grandfather); Mabel Pryde (grandmother)

Kate Nicholson (July 1929 – 18 April 2019) was a British painter and the daughter of artist Ben Nicholson and his first wife, the artist Winifred Nicholson.

== Biography ==
Born at Bankshead, Banks, Cumberland in 1929, Nicholson was a pupil at Claremont College during World War II, which had evacuated to Wales.

Nicholson studied at the Bath Academy of Art from 1949 to 1954 where she was a pupil of Peter Lanyon, a St Ives artist and friend of her father and her stepmother Barbara Hepworth. She taught art at Totnes High School for two years before she moved to St Ives herself in 1957 and became a member of the Penwith Society of Arts. She painted alongside her mother in the 1960s and 1970s, the two often visiting Greece together, as well as North Africa, and to the Isle of Eigg in the Hebrides in 1980.

In addition to Kate and her parents, the Nicholson family also produced other artists, including her grandparents, William Nicholson and Mabel Pryde, aunt Nancy Nicholson, and half-brother Simon Nicholson, and half-sister painter Rachel Nicholson, as well as architect Christopher Nicholson, her uncle.

Nicholson died in 2019, aged 89.

== Solo exhibitions ==
- 1959 Waddington Gallery
- 1962 Waddington Gallery
- 1966 Marjorie Parr Gallery
- 1968 Marjorie Parr Gallery
- 1970 Marjorie Parr Gallery
- 1972 Mignon Gallery, Bath
- 1974 Northern Arts Gallery, Newcastle
- 1975 LYC Museum and Art Gallery
- 1981 LYC Museum and Art Gallery
- 1985 Wills Lane Gallery, St Ives
- 2013 Belgrave Gallery, St Ives
- 2016 Belgrave Gallery, St Ives
- 2019 Falmouth Art Gallery

== See also ==
- List of St. Ives artists
