= Simon Nicholson =

British painter and sculptor (1934–2011)

- Born: Simon Hepworth Nicholson; 3 October 1934; Hampstead, London, England
- Died: 17 January 1990 (aged 55); London, England
- Education: Royal College of Art (First Year), Trinity College, Cambridge
- Known for: Painting, sculpture
- Parents: Ben Nicholson (father); Barbara Hepworth (mother)
- Relatives: Kate Nicholson (half-sister); Nancy Nicholson (aunt); Christopher Nicholson (uncle); William Nicholson (grandfather); Mabel Pryde (grandmother)

Simon Hepworth Nicholson (3 October 1934 – 17 January 1990) was a British painter and sculptor. He was the son of sculptor Barbara Hepworth and her second husband, artist Ben Nicholson.

Nicholson attended Dartington Hall School before studying sculpture at the Royal College of Art from 1953 to 1954 and then archaeology and anthropology at Trinity College, Cambridge, from 1954 to 1957. Like his parents, Nicholson lived and worked in St Ives from 1960 to 1964.

He moved to the United States in 1964 to teach, first at the Moore College of Art and Design, Philadelphia, and later at the University of Berkeley, California. During this time, he had solo exhibitions in San Francisco and Pittsburgh. Nicholson returned to England in 1971 where he was an Open University (OU) lecturer until 1989. He became chairman of the Art and Environment course at the OU, which developed into a popular practical arts module (TAD292). The associated week long summer school achieved some notoriety.

After his death, a retrospective exhibition at Falmouth College of Arts and Dartington Hall was held in 1999.

In addition to Simon and his parents, the Nicholson family also produced four other artists, his grandparents William Nicholson and Mabel Pryde, aunt Nancy Nicholson, sister Rachel and half-sister Kate Nicholson, as well as his architect uncle Christopher Nicholson.

== Interests and influence ==
Nicholson's work is characterised by an interest in the texture of different surfaces and materials, often taking the landscape as its starting point.

His "Theory of Loose Parts", outlined in a 1971 essay, has been influential in playwork, early education and interactive installations of all kinds. He summarised the theory as: "In any environment, both the degree of inventiveness and creativity, and the possibility of discovery, are directly proportional to the number and kind of variables in it." Nicholson's definition of loose parts was broad. In a playwork context, it might include:

- "natural resources – such as straw, mud and pine cones"
- "building materials and tools – planks, nails, hammers"
- "scrap materials – old tyres, off-cuts of guttering"
- "bark which can be both safe playground surfacing and a loose part"
- "and, most essentially, random found objects."

The definition could be even broader:

There is evidence that all children love to interact with variables such as materials and shapes; smells and other physical phenomena, such as electricity, magnetism and gravity; media such as gases and fluids; sounds, music and motion; chemical interactions, cooking and fire; and other people, and animals, plants, words, concepts and ideas. With all these things all children love to play, experiment, discover and invent and have fun. All these things have one thing in common, which is variables or "loose parts".
