= Christopher Nicholson =

British architect and designer (1904–1948)

- Born: Christopher David George Nicholson; 16 December 1904; Pilgrim's Lane, Hampstead, London, England
- Died: 28 July 1948 (aged 43); Samedan, Switzerland
- Occupation: architect
- Years active: 1927–1939, 1946–1948
- Notable work: studio of Augustus John; London Gliding Club
- Spouse: Elsie Queen Myers (m. 1931)
- Parents: William Nicholson (father); Mabel Pryde (mother)
- Relatives: Ben Nicholson (brother); Nancy Nicholson (sister); Kate Nicholson (niece); Simon Nicholson (nephew); Winifred Nicholson (sister-in-law)

Christopher David George "Kit" Nicholson (16 December 1904 – 28 July 1948) was a British architect and designer. His principal buildings of the 1930s show strong influences of the Rationalist and International Modernist architectural movements.

== Early life ==
Nicholson was born on 16 December 1904 at Pilgrim's Lane, Hampstead, the fourth child of the artists William Nicholson and Mabel Pryde. His siblings were the celebrated painter Ben (1894–1982); Anthony (1897–1918), who died of wounds in France during the First World War; and Annie Mary "Nancy" (1899–1978), artist and wife of the poet Robert Graves. Kit Nicholson was educated at Gresham's School, Holt, from 1917 to 1922, and then read architecture at St John's College, Cambridge. In 1926 he won a one-year Davison Scholarship to study architecture at Princeton University.

== Career ==
After his return to Britain in 1927 he undertook several small architectural commissions. From 1929 to 1930 he taught at the School of Architecture of the University of Cambridge; one of his pupils was Hugh Casson. Nicholson moved to London in 1931, and worked for Watson Hart and Val Myer. In December 1931 he married Elsie Queen Myers, usually known as EQ Nicholson, whom he had met in about 1930.

In 1933 he started his own architectural practice, in premises over a chemist's at 100 Fulham Road. Casson joined the practice in 1934, and EQ also worked there.

Between 1933 and 1934 Nicholson worked on the design and construction of a new studio for Augustus John at Fryern Court, near Fordingbridge in Hampshire. In International Modernist style, it had a flat roof and a spiral staircase, was raised on pilotis, and was painted pink.

In 1935 and 1936 he designed and built the premises of the London Gliding Club at Dunstable in Bedfordshire, which showed the influence of the German architect Eric Mendelsohn. In the same period, he made alterations to Monkton House for Edward James, and designed and constructed a private house, Kit's Close, at Henley. In 1938 James asked him to design a new building for his estate at West Dean, which was to incorporate the façade of James Wyatt's Pantheon in Oxford Street, London, which was being demolished.

Nicholson was elected to the Modern Architecture Research Group in 1937, and was on the committee which organised the New Architecture Exhibition held by the group at the New Burlington Galleries in London from 11 to 29 January 1938.

With the outbreak of the Second World War in 1939, Nicholson signed up as a meteorological officer in the Fleet Air Arm. Between 1943 and 1945 he was the commander in charge of flying at the Inskip airfield in Lancashire. In 1945 he flew a Hellcat to Ceylon (now Sri Lanka) to take up a position as commander of the Katukurunda base of the Fleet Air Arm. He flew solo, and the journey took him a month.

After he returned to Britain in 1946, Nicholson resumed practice as an architect. He undertook small commissions, including some design work for exhibition stands, and the design of radio and television sets for Ferranti.

He died in a gliding accident on 28 July 1948, the eighth day of the World Gliding Championships at Samedan in the Graubünden, in Switzerland, where he was on the British team. He was forty-three.

== Legacy and honours ==
In 1988 an exhibition in York showed Nicholson's work beside that of his brother, his sister and his wife. In 1994 the Royal Institute of British Architects acquired his complete collection of drawings, records and photographs for the Drawings Collection of the British Architectural Library.
