= Stafford Gallery =

Former art gallery in London

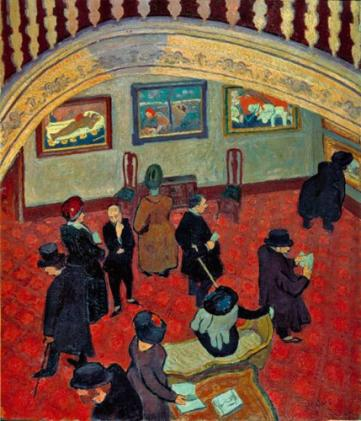
- Spencer Gore: Gauguins and Connoisseurs at the Stafford Gallery, 1911
- Established: before June 1903
- Location: 34 Old Bond Street, London W.; 1 Duke Street, St. James's
- Coordinates: 51°30′31.5″N 0°8′27″W

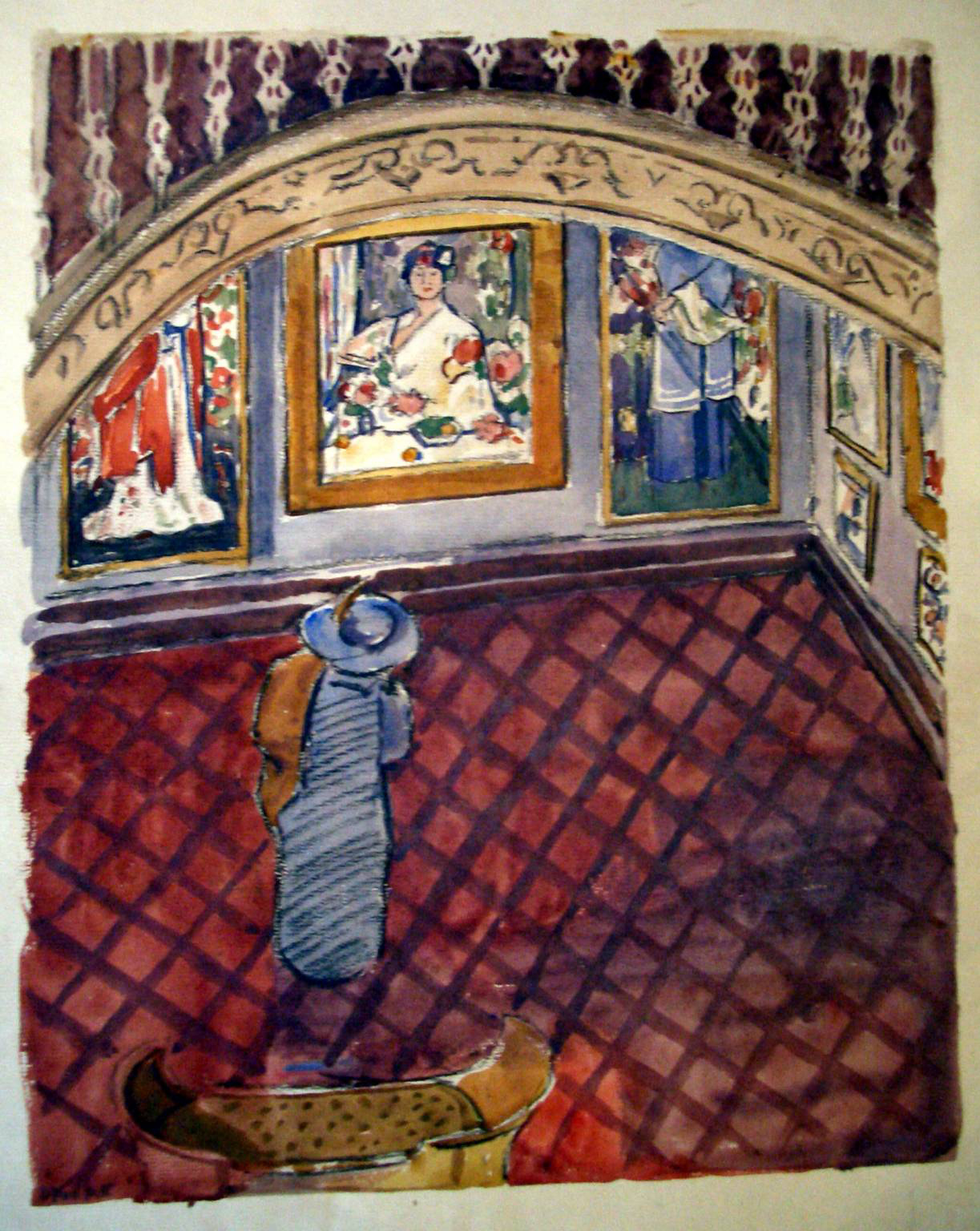
Douglas Fox Pitt, The Stafford Gallery, March 1912, showing paintings by the Scottish Colourist painter J.D. Fergusson

The Stafford Gallery was an art gallery in London in the early twentieth century. Among the artists whose works were exhibited there are both international figures such as Pablo Picasso, Paul Gauguin, Paul Cézanne and Gustave Courbet, and British painters including Walter Sickert and Sir William Nicholson.

The gallery opened in the early years of the century at 34 Old Bond Street, London W., on the corner with Stafford Street; by 1910 it had moved to 1 Duke Street, St. James's.

== Exhibitions ==
In June 1903 the gallery showed watercolours by William Nicholson of the colleges of Oxford University. Twenty-four lithographs of these, with descriptive text by Arthur Waugh, were published by the gallery in two folios in 1905. Nicholson also provided the cover illustration for the catalogue of an exhibition of old masters in 1910.

In the second decade of the century, and thus shortly after Roger Fry's Manet and the Post-Impressionists at the Grafton Galleries in 1910–1911, the Stafford Gallery began to show more avant-garde works, particularly by French artists. In 1911 there were exhibitions of paintings by Courbet (March), Sickert (June), Gauguin and Cézanne (November), and possibly Camille Pissarro in October; work by Vincent van Gogh may also have been shown. The Gauguin show is the subject of Spencer Gore's painting Gauguins and Connoisseurs at the Stafford Gallery. In 1912 there were exhibitions of paintings by the Scottish Colourist painter J.D. Fergusson in March, and drawings by Picasso in April.
