= Winifred Nicholson =

British painter (1893–1981)

- Nicholson in 1969, photographed by Pamela Chandler
- Born: Rosa Winifred Roberts; 21 December 1893; Oxford, England
- Died: 5 March 1981 (aged 87); Carlisle, Cumbria, England
- Education: Byam Shaw School of Art
- Known for: still-life, landscape
- Spouse: Ben Nicholson (m. 1920; div. 1938)
- Children: three, including Kate Nicholson
- Website: winifrednicholson.com

From Bedroom Window, Bankshead, date unknown, private collection

Costa Brava, 1953, Government Art Collection

Rosa Winifred Nicholson (Note: Following her separation from her husband, she sometimes used the name "Winifred Dacre". "Dacre" is an old Howard family name; see Lord Carlisle.) (née Roberts; 21 December 1893 – 5 March 1981) was a British painter. She was married to the painter Ben Nicholson, and was thus the daughter-in-law of the painter William Nicholson and his wife, the painter Mabel Pryde. She was the mother of the painter Kate Nicholson.

== Life ==
Nicholson was born Rosa Winifred Roberts in Oxford on 21 December 1893. She was the eldest of the three children of the Liberal Party politician Charles Henry Roberts and Lady Cecilia Maude Howard, daughter of the politician George Howard, 9th Earl of Carlisle, and of the activist Rosalind Howard. Nicholson started painting as a teenager with her grandfather George Howard, who was a capable amateur painter and a friend of the Pre-Raphaelites William Morris and Edward Burne-Jones, and of the Italian landscape painter Nino Costa, founder of the Etruscan School. Nicholson attended the Byam Shaw School of Art in London from about 1910 or 1912 until the outbreak of the First World War in 1914, and again from 1918 to 1919.

In 1919, Nicholson travelled with her father, who had been Under-Secretary of State for India, to Burma (now Myanmar), Ceylon (now Sri Lanka) and India.

On 4 November 1920, she married the artist Ben Nicholson, the son of the painter Sir William Newzam Prior Nicholson and his wife, the painter Mabel Pryde. The couple bought a villa in Switzerland, the Villa Capriccio near the village of Castagnola on the north shore of Lake Lugano in Ticino. They spent the winters in Switzerland and the summers in Britain, painting still-lifes and landscapes. In 1924, Winifred bought Bankshead, a farmhouse built on an ancient Roman castle forming part of Hadrian's Wall, at Banks, not far from the town of Brampton in Cumberland, and close to the family seat, Naworth Castle.

In 1924, Nicholson, who believed that she was unable to conceive, joined the Christian Science movement, which was in vogue in Britain at that time. She and Ben eventually had three children: Jake was born in 1927, Kate in July 1929, and Andrew in 1931. By the time of Kate's birth, there were tensions in the marriage, and these were exacerbated by the suicide of their close friend, the painter Kit Wood, in August 1930. In 1931, Ben met Barbara Hepworth – whom he later married – and he and Winifred separated. In 1932, Winifred moved with her three children to Paris, and from then until 1936 Ben often visited them there, sometimes with Hepworth; the marriage ended in divorce in 1938, and Ben married Hepworth in November of the same year. In Paris Nicholson formed friendships with a number of modernist and abstract artists, among them Hans Arp, Constantin Brâncuși, César Domela, Jean Hélion and Piet Mondrian.

She died in Cumbria on 5 March 1981.

== Work ==
Nicholson painted mostly still-lifes and landscapes. While in Paris in the 1930s she made some abstract works.

== Reception ==
Significant exhibitions of her works have taken place at the Tate Gallery (1987), at the Tullie House Museum and Art Gallery in Carlisle, Cumbria, at Kettle's Yard in Cambridge and at the Dean Gallery in Edinburgh.
