= The Old Man of Lochnagar =

Children's book written by King Charles III

- Author: Charles III
- Illustrator: Hugh Casson
- Language: English
- Genre: Children's fiction
- Publisher: Hamish Hamilton
- Publication date: November 1980
- Publication place: United Kingdom
- Media type: Print (hardcover)
- Pages: 46
- ISBN: 0-241-10527-7
- OCLC: 219806186

The Old Man of Lochnagar is a 1980 children's book written by King Charles III, at that time the Prince of Wales, and illustrated by Sir Hugh Casson. The story revolves around an old man who lives in a cave in the cliffs surrounding the corrie loch under the Lochnagar, a mountain which overlooks the royal estate at Balmoral in Scotland where the Royal Family spend much of their summer holidays.

The story of the Old man of Lochnagar originated as a bedtime story King Charles had told some years earlier to entertain his brothers, Andrew and Edward, when they were children. The book was published in 1980 in aid of The Prince's Trust charity.

The book was later adapted into an animated short film by the BBC in 1993, with Robbie Coltrane providing the voice of the hermit and Prince Charles narrating. The film was titled The Old Man of Lochnagar in the UK and The Legend of Lochnagar in North America. The book was also adapted into a musical stage play. In 1984, Prince Charles read the story on the BBC children's programme Jackanory. He has also read it in Welsh and Scottish Gaelic translations on television.

In 2007, National Youth Ballet of Great Britain received permission from the Prince of Wales to create a new ballet based on the story. With choreography by Drew McOnie and a commissioned score by Nigel Hess, the ballet received its première at Sadler's Wells Theatre, London on 14 October 2007 and was performed from 24 to 27 October at Leatherhead Theatre in Surrey.

== Plot ==
The book comprises six parts.

=== Part One ===
The old man loses his grip while attempting to scale the Lochnagar cliff and falls into the loch, where he meets "lagopus Scoticus", a "freshwater variant of Neptune". The man and lagopus Scoticus converse using bubbles which display their thoughts in written text and go hunting for "Loch-haggis" in a "sea-rover" underwater vehicle. After the hunt, the old man "feast[s] on Loch-haggis and suffer[s] terribly from wind", before going to sleep beside the loch.

=== Part Two ===
The old man wakes up with "a slight hangover", then sneezes so violently that the force directed into the ground shoots him up into the air. He ends up on top of Lochnagar but is then swept up by a golden eagle that carries him as far as Balmoral, where he bounces on a trampoline before coming to rest. He goes to the fountain and meets Mr Toad, who happens to have tenancy there. The toad offers help and agrees to take the man back to his cave. The man goes to sleep.

=== Part Three ===
Having slept for "several days" the man wakes and goes to use his specially designed toilet. The toilet is so designed that bagpipes are played when it is flushed. On the toilet, the man reads books given to him by the Gorms – a race of "friendly little people" who live in "the stone cairns near Lochnagar" – in which they describe their world and promise to invite him to visit "when their research scientists ha[ve] discovered the right formula for a potion which, when drunk, would shrink the old man to the size of the little people". The man decides to go to Loch Muick and calls "twelve cock capercaillie" towards him. He harnesses them to a carriage and flies to the loch, landing his craft on the water "like a flying boat". He gives the birds "sugared daddy-long-legs" as a reward. The old man then gets two ospreys called "Skean" and "Dhu" to fish trout from the water for him. The capercaillie, ospreys and the old man all eat the fish together in the evening, exchanging stories until late at night.

=== Part Four ===
The man risks flying home to his cave by night, and has a few near-accidents on the way. He sleeps a few hours, then receives a letter and package from "a grouse with an evil look in its eye" as he is eating breakfast. It is an invitation to join the Gorms in their cairn; however, the man drinks the bottle without reading the warning on the front and thus has to make his way to the Gorms in a shrunken state, journeying "through giant clumps of heather and gigantic boulders". A group of Gorms laugh at his struggle as they see him arriving, then also as he slips on the floor upon entering. He descends a flight of stairs to a "vast hall" where the "king of the Gorms" is sitting "[a]t the far end of the room".

=== Part Five ===
The man slips as he approaches the king and is once again laughed at by the Gorms. He later discovers that the king wears rubber soles to prevent this happening to him and that the king also wears a "peculiar rubber matt" over his bottom to "prevent him slipping off his throne all the time". The king gives him a tour of the cairn and its industries. The reader discovers that is the Gorms who manufacture copper and put it on copper beach trees and go out on "heathercraft" to spray heather with a "purple liquid" without which it "wouldn't be as beautiful and purple as it is". The man then sees women "milking hind stag beetles", but accidentally "dilute[s] the special shrinking mixture" in his stomach and begins to grow back to full size. He is rushed out of the cairn before he grows back fully.

=== Part Six ===
The old man decides to visit London after overhearing the conversations of "people having picnics in the heather". He boards a train at Ballater, but the train is stopped near Aboyne by cows on the line. The cows are then cleared but the train is impeded again at Aberdeen, whence it can go no further because "heavy falls of snow ha[ve] blocked the line to London". The man decides to return to Ballater, but sees on the platform a woman dressed entirely in tartan and wearing a "huge hat [...] angrily prodding the station-master with her umbrella", in protest over the London service's cancellation.

The story ends by saying that the old man was secretly rather pleased not to go to London. "He couldn't think of anywhere more special to be", concludes the storyteller, "than to be living at the foot of Lochnagar."
