= William Nicholson (artist, born 1872) =

British painter, engraver and illustrator (1872–1949)

Sir William Nicholson
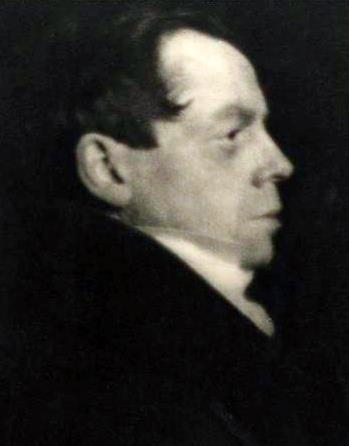
- Nicholson photographed in 1908 by Alvin Langdon Coburn
- Born: William Newzam Prior Nicholson; 5 February 1872; Newark-on-Trent, Nottinghamshire
- Died: 16 May 1949 (aged 77); Blewbury, Berkshire (now Oxfordshire)
- Known for: painter of portraits, still-lifes and landscapes; engraver, graphic artist, illustrator
- Spouses: Mabel Pryde, 1893–1918 (her death); Edith Stuart-Wortley, 1919 – before 1935 (separated)
- Children: five, including Ben, Nancy and Christopher
- Relatives: EQ Nicholson, daughter-in-law; Winifred Nicholson, daughter-in-law; Kate Nicholson, granddaughter; Simon Nicholson, grandson

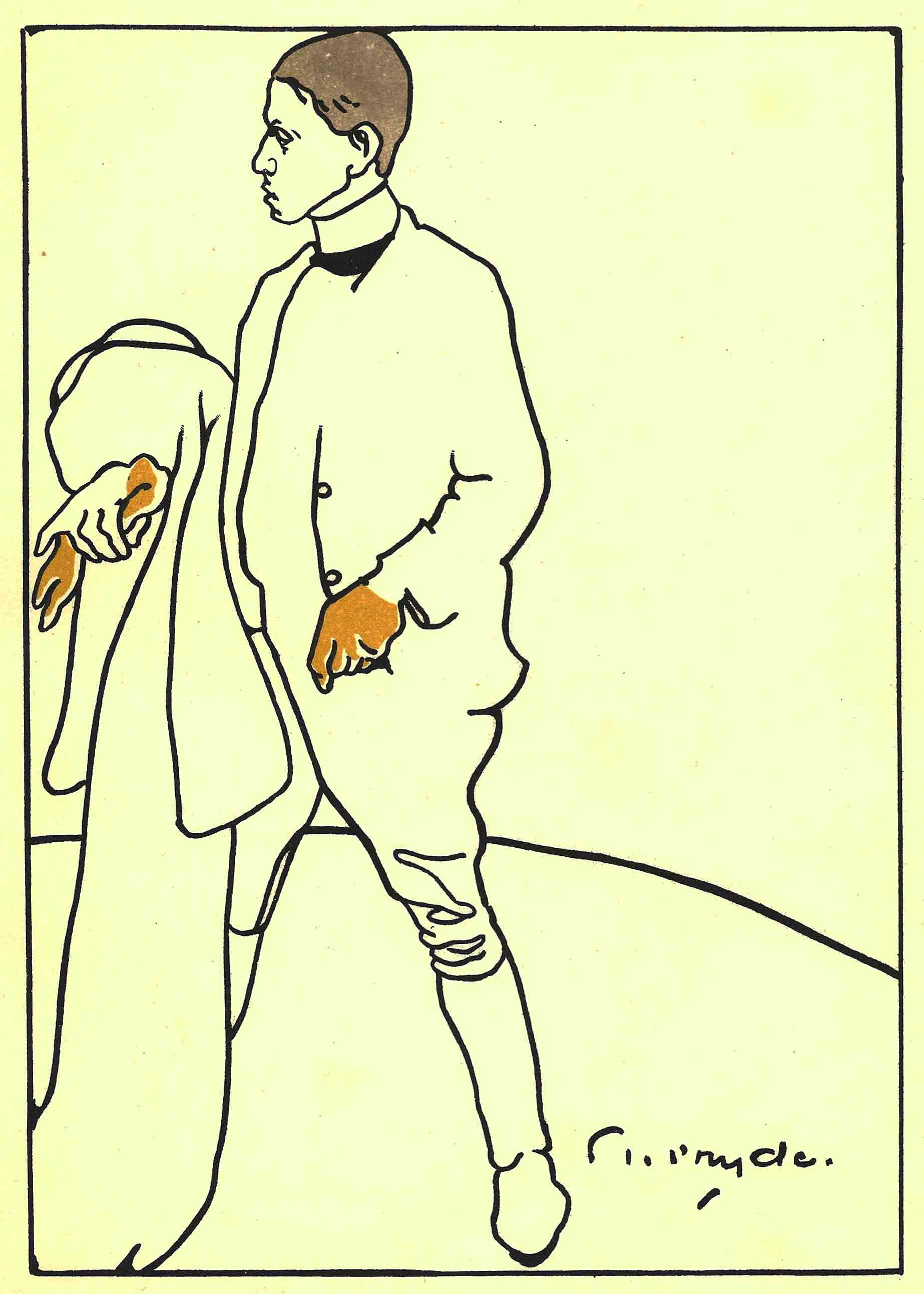
Lithograph portrait of Nicholson by James Pryde, published in The Studio, December 1897

Sir William Newzam Prior Nicholson (5 February 1872 – 16 May 1949) was a British painter of still-life, landscape and portraits, but is mainly remembered as an illustrator and printmaker in techniques including woodcut, wood-engraving and lithography. He was also an author of children's books and worked as a designer for the theatre.

In his twenties he achieved great success as a designer and printmaker, especially in woodcuts with limited colouring. Most showed a single figure. A number of sets of these were then reproduced as lithographs and published as books or in much larger unbound editions.

== Life ==
William Nicholson was born in Newark-on-Trent on 5 February 1872, the youngest son of William Newzam Nicholson, an industrialist and Conservative MP of Newark, and his wife Annie Elizabeth Prior, the daughter of Joseph Prior and Elizabeth (née Mallam) of Woodstock, Oxon. From the age of 9 he attended Magnus Grammar School, first as a weekly boarder, later as a day-boy. He had art lessons from the painter, politician and art-master William Cubley of Newark-on-Trent, who had been a pupil of Sir William Beechey, in turn a pupil of Sir Joshua Reynolds. He was briefly a student at Hubert von Herkomer's art school, where he met his future wife Mabel Pryde (1871–1918), who introduced him to her brother James Pryde (1866–1941). From the autumn of 1891 he attended the Académie Julian in Paris, but after six months returned to Newark.

In the spring of 1893, Nicholson eloped with Mabel Pryde, whom he had by then known for four years; they were married in Ruislip on 25 April. The couple went to live in what had been a pub, the Eight Bells at Denham, Bucks. They were soon joined by Mabel's brother James, and not long after by Ellen Terry's son Edward Gordon Craig and his wife May, who had also recently eloped and married. Nicholson received an annual allowance of £150 from his father.

William and Mabel Nicholson had four children: the celebrated painter Ben (1894–1982); Anthony (1897–1918), who died of wounds in France near the end of the First World War; Annie Mary "Nancy" (1899–1978), artist and wife of the poet Robert Graves; and the architect and designer Christopher "Kit" (1904–1948). Mabel died in July 1918 in the Spanish flu epidemic, and Anthony died soon afterwards.

From about 1910 until he remarried in 1919, Nicholson's housekeeper Marie Laquelle, whose real name was Adèle Marie Schwarz, née Schiestel, was also his mistress. Nicholson painted her several times, first as Carlina in 1909; he also painted her daughter Georgette and her second husband Norman Holder.

In October 1919, Nicholson married Edith Stuart-Wortley, widow of Sir John Stuart-Wortley; she – under the name Elizabeth Drury – was also a painter. Nicholson had painted her in the previous year as Lady in Grey. Their daughter Liza was born in 1920. Edie had two children from her previous marriage, and Nancy's daughter Jennie had been born the previous year. Nicholson's books for children all date from the 1920s; at about this time he lived at the Old Manor House in Sutton Veny, in Wiltshire. Nicholson became friendly with the statesman and amateur painter Winston Churchill in the 1930s, and gave him advice on his work.

From 1935 until his death, Nicholson's companion was the novelist Marguerite Steen. According to Steen, they met in Andalucia in May 1935, and by mid-June were living together at Nicholson's mews studio in Apple Tree Yard, off Jermyn Street. Nicholson had been separated from Edie for some years, but they remained on good terms; although she promised to give him a divorce, she never did so.

In later life, Nicholson lived at Blewbury in Berkshire (now Oxfordshire), where he died on 16 May 1949.

== Work ==
=== Graphic work ===
From 1893 to 1898, Nicholson collaborated with his brother-in-law James Pryde on poster design and other graphic work including signboard painting and book illustration. They called themselves the Beggarstaffs, or J. & W. Beggarstaff; they were later sometimes referred to as the Beggarstaff Brothers, although they did not use this name.

=== Book design and illustration ===
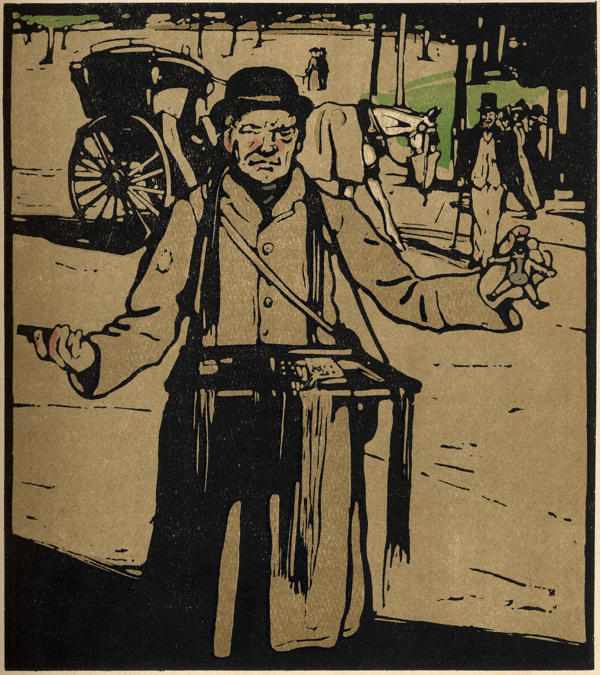
"Hawker (Kensington)", 1898

Nicholson provided illustrations and a cover design for An Alphabet by William Nicholson, An Almanac of Twelve Sports by William Nicholson with words by Rudyard Kipling, and London Types, all three published by William Heinemann in 1898. Two years later came The Square book of Animals by Sir William Nicholson with Rhymes by Arthur Waugh (W. Heinemann, 1900). He also illustrated several of the early books of his son-in-law Robert Graves and The Velveteen Rabbit, a book for children by Margery Williams (1922), and a new edition by Heinemann of John Gay’s Polly (1923). He also wrote and illustrated two books of his own for children, Clever Bill (1926) and The Pirate Twins (1929), both published by Faber & Faber. In 1929 he provided illustrations for a new edition of Siegfried Sassoon’s Memoirs of a Fox-Hunting Man.

=== Paintings ===
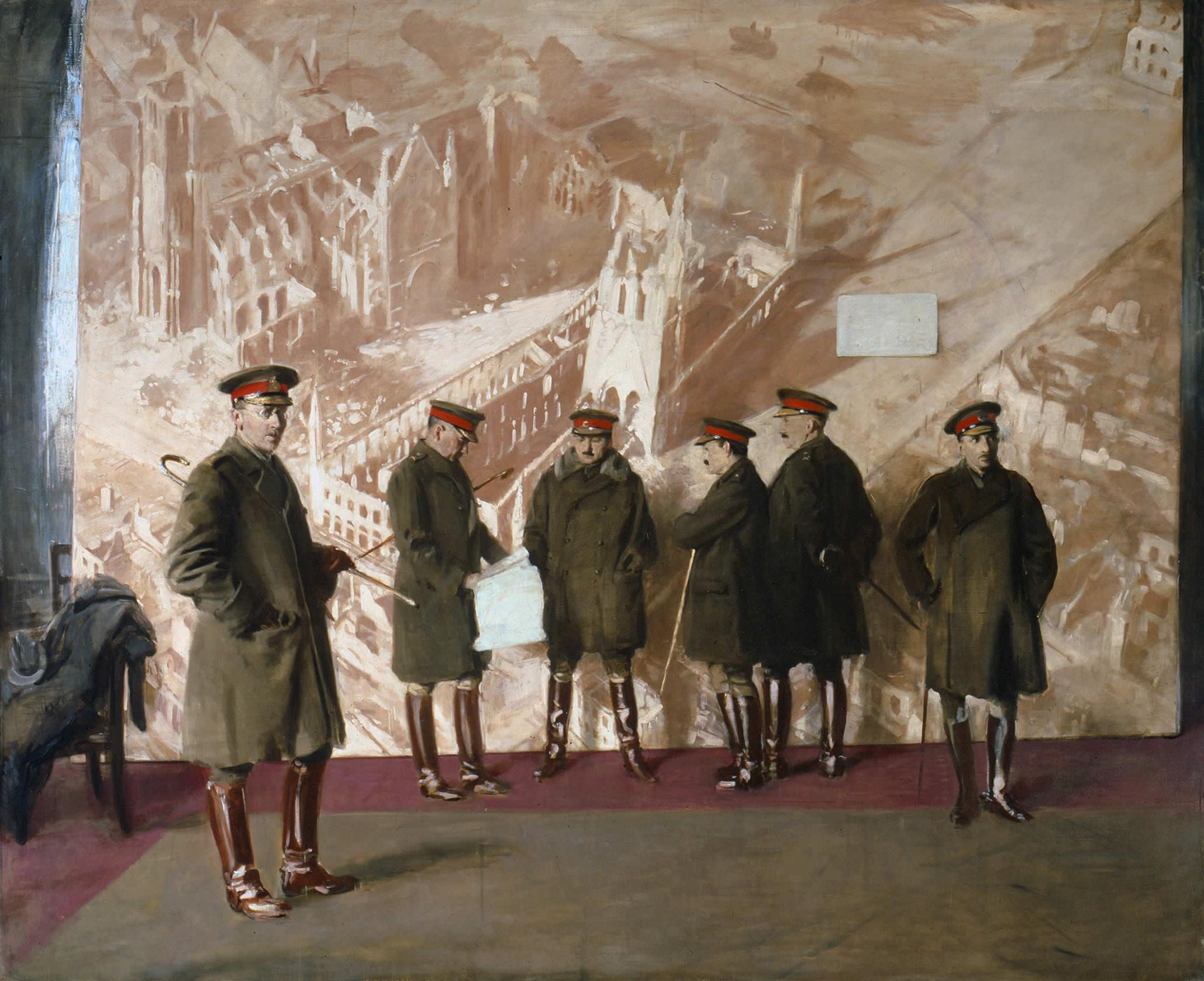
Canadian Headquarters Staff, 1918 Canadian War Museum, Beaverbrook Collection of War Art

From about 1900, Nicholson concentrated on painting, encouraged by Whistler. He first exhibited as a painter at the International Society, of which Whistler was President.

=== Work in other fields ===
In 1904, he designed the original settings for Peter Pan, and went on to design other plays and to illustrate several books. He also designed stained glass, notably a memorial window at St Andrew's Church, Mells.

== Reception ==
Olympic medal record

Art competitions
Gold medal – first place	1928 Amsterdam	Graphic works

Nicholson was awarded a gold medal in the graphic works section of the Art competitions at the 1928 Summer Olympics in Amsterdam for his Almanach de douze sports 1898, the French edition of the Almanac of Twelve Sports, published 30 years earlier. He was knighted in 1936.

== Published works ==
=== As author and illustrator ===
- An Alphabet. London: William Heinemann, 1898.
- Twelve Portraits. London: William Heinemann; [New York]: R.H. R[ussell], 1899.

- Douze portraits Paris: H. Floury, [1899].

- Characters of Romance. London: William Heinemann, New York: R.H. Russell, 1900.
- Twelve Portraits – Second Series. London: William Heinemann; New York: R.H. Russell, 1902.
- Clever Bill. [London]: William Heinemann, [1926].
- The Pirate Twins. [London]: Faber & Faber, [1929].
- The Book of Blokes. [London]: Faber & Faber, [1929].

=== As illustrator ===
- An Almanac of Twelve Sports. Verses by Rudyard Kipling, illustrations by William Nicholson. London: William Heinemann, 1897.

- Almanach de douze sports 1898. Illustrations by William Nicholson, text by Octave Uzanne (Kipling's verses were not used in the French edition). Paris: Société française d'éditions d'art, [1898].

- London Types. Quatorzains by William Ernest Henley, illustrations by William Nicholson. London: William Heinemann; New York: R.H. Russell, 1898.
- Tony Drum: a Cockney Boy. Edwin Pugh, ten coloured plates from designs by the Beggarstaff Brothers (five by Nicholson, five by James Pryde). London: William Heinemann; New York: Henry Holt and Company, 1898.
- The Square Book of Animals. Rhymes by Arthur Waugh, illustrations by William Nicholson. London: William Heinemann, 1900 (designed 1896, copyright 1899).
- Oxford, Parts I and II, each containing lithographs by William Nicholson, descriptive notes by Arthur Waugh. London: Stafford Gallery, 1905.
- The Velveteen Rabbit, or, How Toys Became Real. Margery Williams, illustrations by William Nicholson. London: William Heinemann, 1922.

== Exhibitions ==
The principal exhibitions of William Nicholson include:

Date	Gallery	Catalogue	Notes
1903	Stafford Gallery, London	The Works of William Nicholson	first one-man show
April 1905	Galeries Barbazanges, Paris	Exposition des oeuvres de William Nicholson	
1906	W. B. Paterson Gallery, London		
June–July 1910	Chenil Gallery, London	Exhibition of Paintings by William Nicholson: Rottingdean Landscapes and Other Subjects	
April–May 1911	Goupil Galleries, London	Oil Paintings by William Nicholson	
June–July 1918	Goupil Galleries, London	Still-life etc. by William Nicholson	
June–July 1927	Beaux Arts Gallery, London	Pictures and Drawings by William Nicholson	
1930	Beaux Arts Gallery, London		
1933	Castle Museum and Art Gallery, Nottingham		first retrospective
May–June 1933	Beaux Arts Gallery, London	Retrospective Exhibition of Paintings by William Nicholson	retrospective
1934	City Museum and Art Gallery, Belfast	Loan Exhibition of Paintings and Prints by William Nicholson	retrospective
1934	Leicester Galleries, London	Recent Paintings by William Nicholson	
1936	Leicester Galleries, London	An Exhibition of Paintings by William Nicholson	
1938	Leicester Galleries, London	An Exhibition of Paintings by Sir William Nicholson	
1942	National Gallery, London	Exhibition of Paintings by Sir William Nicholson and Jack B. Yeats	retrospective, with Jack Yeats retrospective
1943	Leicester Galleries, London		
1945	Roland, Browse and Delbanco, London	Paintings by Sir William Nicholson	
1947	Arts Council, London	Sir William Nicholson: Paintings, Woodcuts and Lithographs	
1951	Leger Gallery, London		
1951	Roland, Browse and Delbanco, London		
1954	Roland, Browse and Delbanco, London		
1967	Marlborough Fine Art, London	William Nicholson	
1967	Folio Society, London	Sir William Nicholson: Prints and Drawings	
1972	Roland, Browse and Delbanco, London; Aldeburgh Festival	William Nicholson Centenary Exhibition	
1980–81	Arts Council of Great Britain: Fitzwilliam Museum, Cambridge; City Museum and Art Gallery, Stoke-on-Trent; City Art Gallery, Bristol; Cartwright Hall, Bradford	William Nicholson: Paintings, Drawings and Prints	
April–May 1981	Maclean Gallery	William Nicholson: Woodcuts and Lithographs	
1982–83	Galleria d'Arte Moderna, Milan; Palazzo Venezia, Rome	William Nicholson: segno e immagine in un'ottica vittoriana	
1990	Browse & Darby	William Nicholson, 1872–1949	
1995–96	Towner Art Gallery, Eastbourne; Kettle's Yard, Cambridge; Castle Museum and Art Gallery, Nottingham; Browse & Darby, London	William Nicholson: Landscape and Still-life	
May–July 1998	Kunsthalle Darmstadt, Darmstadt	William Nicholson, das graphische Werk: 1895–1905	
October 2004–January 2005	Royal Academy of Arts, London	William Nicholson (1872–1949): British Painter and Printmaker	
November 2025–May 2026	Pallant House Gallery, Chichester, England	William Nicholson	
