= Nancy Nicholson =

English painter and fabric designer (1899–1977)

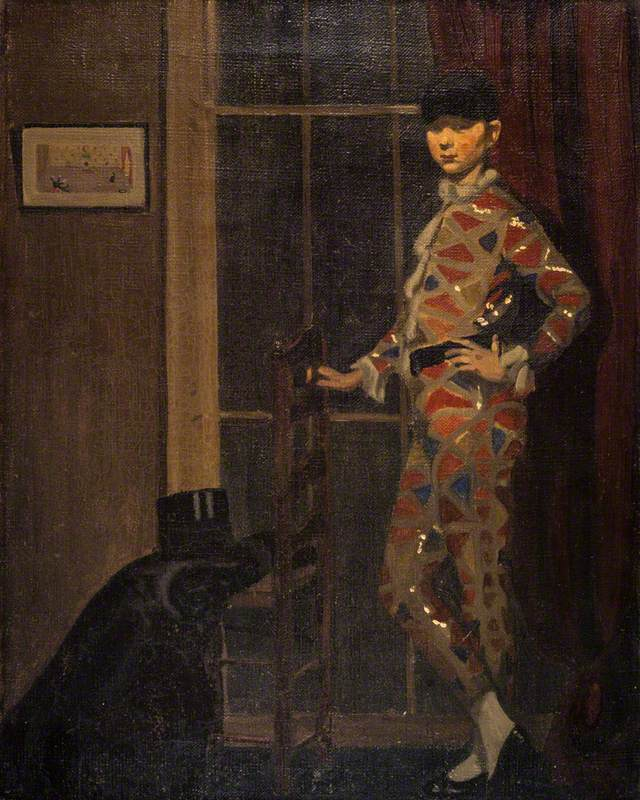
- Mabel Pryde - Harlequin with Chair NGS NGS GMA
- Born: Annie Mary Pryde Nicholson; 1899; Woodstock, Oxfordshire, England
- Died: 1977 (aged 77–78); Salisbury, Wiltshire, England
- Known for: Fabric design
- Spouse: Robert Graves (m. 1918; div. 1949)
- Children: 4
- Parents: William Nicholson (father); Mabel Pryde (mother)
- Relatives: Ben Nicholson (brother); Christopher Nicholson (brother); Kate Nicholson (niece); Simon Nicholson (nephew)

Annie "Nancy" Mary Pryde Nicholson (1899–1977) was an English painter and fabric designer.

== Early life ==
Born Annie Mary Pryde Nicholson, she was the only daughter of the artists Sir William Nicholson and Mabel Pryde. She had three brothers, artist Ben, architect Christopher and Anthony, who was killed in action in 1918 in the First World War.

== Robert Graves ==
Nancy married the poet Robert Graves on 23 January 1918, at St James's Church, Piccadilly.

The following year, Graves started as a student at St John's College, Oxford. The couple lived in a cottage on Boars Hill in Oxford, which they rented from the author John Masefield. In 1920, in partnership with a neighbour, The Hon. Mrs Michael Howard, Nancy set up a small grocer's shop, next door to the Masefields' house. Alarmed by the tourists it attracted, Mrs Masefield opposed its takeover by an Oxford firm, and the project collapsed after six months, leaving heavy debts settled only with the help of friends and family. In disgust, Graves and Nancy moved to the village of Islip, the other side of Oxford.

A lifelong feminist, Nancy used to cycle to Oxfordshire villages and set up a stall to explain to women how to use contraception, when distributing such information if deemed obscene was illegal. Her open-mindedness led her to accept a triangular relationship, and from early 1926 Laura Riding lived with her and Graves in London The marriage eventually broke down, as Graves increasingly favoured Riding, leaving Nancy to bring up the four children of the marriage alone, in a succession of locations, including Cumberland and a further spell on Boars Hill. Nancy and Graves legally divorced in 1949.

== Publishing and textile design ==
After a period in the early 1930s living with Geoffrey Taylor on a houseboat moored in Hammersmith, Nancy set up the Poulk Press, in which she collaborated for a time with him. They lived near Sutton Veny, Wiltshire, in a timber house designed by Nancy and built with family labour. Her relationship with Taylor lasted five years. She worked at this period with her brother Ben and his wife Barbara Hepworth on textiles.

Undeterred by the failure of the Boars Hill shop, in the 1940s she ran a business in Motcomb Street, London. Her designs influenced her sister-in-law EQ Nicholson. Her work was exhibited at the Victoria and Albert Museum in 1976.
