= Carola Oman =

English novelist and children's writer (1897–1978)

Carola Oman CBE
- Oman circa 1921, The Queen
- Born: Carola Mary Anima Oman; 11 May 1897; Oxford, England
- Died: 11 June 1978 (aged 81); England
- Occupations: Historical novelist, biographer, children's writer
- Spouse: Gerald Foy Ray Lenanton
- Writing career
- Genres: Historical fiction, biography, children's literature
- Notable works: Robin Hood; Nelson

Carola Oman CBE (11 May 1897 – 11 June 1978) was an English historical novelist, biographer and children's writer. She was best known for her retelling of the Robin Hood legend and for a 1946 biography of Admiral Lord Nelson.

== Background ==
Carola Mary Anima Oman was born on 11 May 1897 in Oxford, the second of three children of the military historian Sir Charles Oman (1860–1946) of All Souls and his wife Mary (1866–1950), daughter of General Robert Maclagan of the Royal Engineers. She described her upbringing in her final book, illustrated with photographs: An Oxford Childhood.

As a child, Oman wrote several plays that were performed by friends. Another early interest was photography. She was sent in 1906 to Miss Batty's, later Wychwood School in Oxford. She would have liked to have gone to boarding school, but her parents would not agree, and she continued at Miss Batty's until the spring of 1914.

The family moved in 1908 into Frewin Hall, now part of Brasenose College, Oxford. Her brother Charles (C. C. Oman) became a keeper of the Victoria and Albert Museum and wrote several books on silverware and other domestic metalwork. The set designer Julia Trevelyan Oman (1930–2003) was her niece.

Daily Mirror, 1924

Oman worked as a VAD in England and then in France in 1918–1919: soon after her 1919 discharge, she met Gerald Foy Ray Lenanton (1896–1952), a soldier returning from France who would later join his family business as a timber broker. After marrying Lenanton on 26 April 1922, Oman became Lady Lenanton when her husband was knighted in 1946 for his World War II service as director of home timber production. The couple, who remained childless, lived from 1928 at Bride Hall, a Jacobean mansion in Ayot St Lawrence, Hertfordshire. In 1965, Oman produced Ayot Rectory – A Family Memoir, about the Sneade family, who had lived in the village from 1780 to 1858. Oman was quoted as speaking warmly of fellow villager George Bernard Shaw, who had been the Lenantons' first caller at Bride Hall in 1928. Gerald Lenanton died in 1952 after a period of incapacitation from a stroke.

The novelist Georgette Heyer was a lifelong friend, who compiled a 16-page index for Oman's Britain against Napoleon, published in 1942 by Faber. Another writer friend in Oxford was Joanna Cannan, who dedicated her 1931 novel High Table to Oman.

== Writings ==
From The Guardian obituary for Carola Oman
A poetess, a novelist, but above all an historian,...Carola Oman was renowned for her writing style. She did not so much popularise history as elevate the level of popular history.

Sunday Mirror, 1922

In her writing career of over half a century, Oman produced over 30 books of fiction, history and biography for adults and children. Her first publication, a book of verse entitled The Menin Road and Other Poems (1919), drew on her war work as a probationary VAD nurse in Oxford, Dorset, London and France in 1918–1919. She was included in the 1931 edition of The Bookman Treasury of Living Poets, edited by Arthur St. John Adcock. However, Oman largely abandoned poetry for the genre of historical fiction; her 1924 debut novel The Road Royal focused on Mary Queen of Scots. It was followed by Princess Amelia (1924), King Heart (on James IV of Scotland/ 1926), Crouchback (on the Wars of the Roses/ 1929), Major Grant (Colquhoun Grant/ 1931), The Empress (on Empress Matilda/ 1932), The Best of His Family (on Shakespeare, 1933), and Over the Water (on Bonnie Prince Charlie/ 1935). Oman also had two novels published under the pseudonym C. Lenanton, though her identity was an open secret: Miss Barrett's Elopement (1929) focusing on Elizabeth Barrett Browning and Fair Stood the Wind (1930), an early venture of hers into the genre of contemporary fiction.

While Oman's historical novels were well received, she would herself later speak of them as "very bad" and from the mid-1930s channelled her interest into the past, writing biographies, beginning with Henrietta Maria (1936), followed by one of Elizabeth of Bohemia: The Winter Queen (1938). However, Oman produced several historical novels for younger readers, notably Robin Hood: Prince of Outlaws (1937), cited as "one of the most influential of the juvenile literary publications", which remained continuously in print for at least 40 years. Oman's first novel for younger readers: Ferry the Fearless (focusing on the Third Crusade), had been published in 1936. Her later output in that genre included Alfred, King of the English (1939) and Baltic Spy (1940) (focusing on James Robertson). Oman also wrote two more contemporary novels for adults – her last: Nothing to Report (1941) and Somewhere in England (1943).

Oman's 1946 biography of Horatio Nelson drew on material unavailable to Alfred Thayer Mahan, author of the previously definitive biography of Nelson, published in 1897. Oman had access to the papers of Lady Nelson assembled by the founder of the Nelson Museum, Monmouth. Nelson: a Biography won the Sunday Times Prize for English Literature,

Oman's 1953 biography of the Peninsular War general Sir John Moore was awarded the James Tait Black Memorial Prize. Following that, she was asked in 1954 to lecture on Moore to the Anglo-American Conference of Historians at the Institute of Historical Research, University of London. Her later biographical output covered David Garrick (1958), Mary of Modena (1962) and Sir Walter Scott: The Wizard of the North (1973). The warm reviews of the last include one by the English poet Elizabeth Jennings in The Catholic Herald. According to an obituary, "She did not so much popularise history as elevate the level of popular history."

== Honours ==
Carola Oman was appointed a trustee of the National Maritime Museum and later of the National Portrait Gallery. She was appointed a CBE in 1957. She died at Ayot St Lawrence on 11 June 1978. There is a memorial to her and her husband in the village church.

== External resources ==
- "The full text of the David Garrick biography online". Archived from the original on 18 March 2013 – via Questia.
- Carola Oman's World War I poem "Unloading Ambulance Train", on a school website: Retrieved 1 August 2012.
