= Ben Nicholson =

British abstract painter (1894–1982)

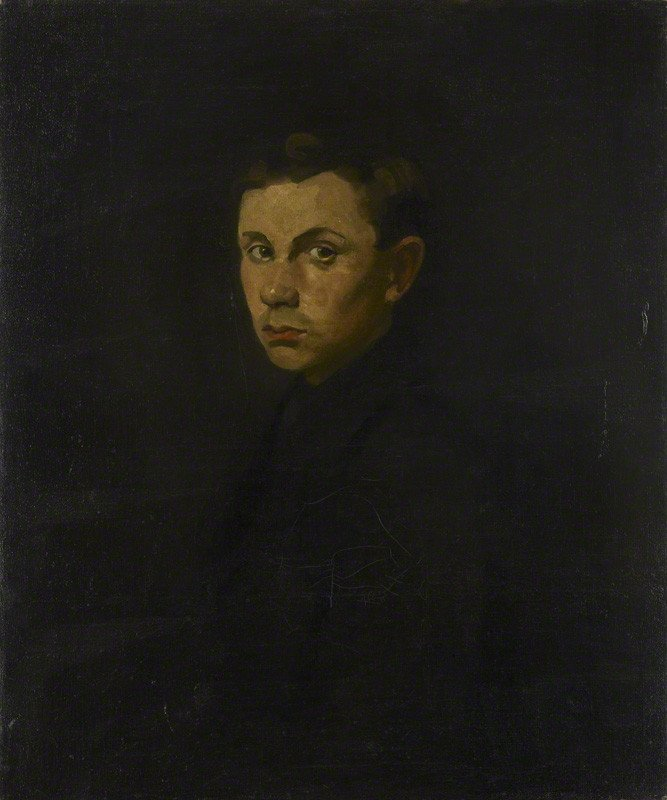
- Portrait of Ben Nicholson by Mabel Pryde, circa 1910–1914
- Born: Benjamin Lauder Nicholson; 10 April 1894; Eight Bells, Denham, Buckinghamshire, England
- Died: 6 February 1982 (aged 87); Hampstead, London, England
- Education: The Slade
- Known for: Painting, sculpture
- Movement: abstract art
- Spouses: Winifred Roberts (m. 1920; div. 1938) Barbara Hepworth (m. 1938; div. 1951) Felicitas Vogler (m. 1957; div. 1977)
- Children: 6, including Kate and Simon
- Parents: William Nicholson (father); Mabel Pryde (mother)
- Relatives: Nancy Nicholson (sister); Christopher Nicholson (brother); James Pryde (uncle)
- Awards: OM

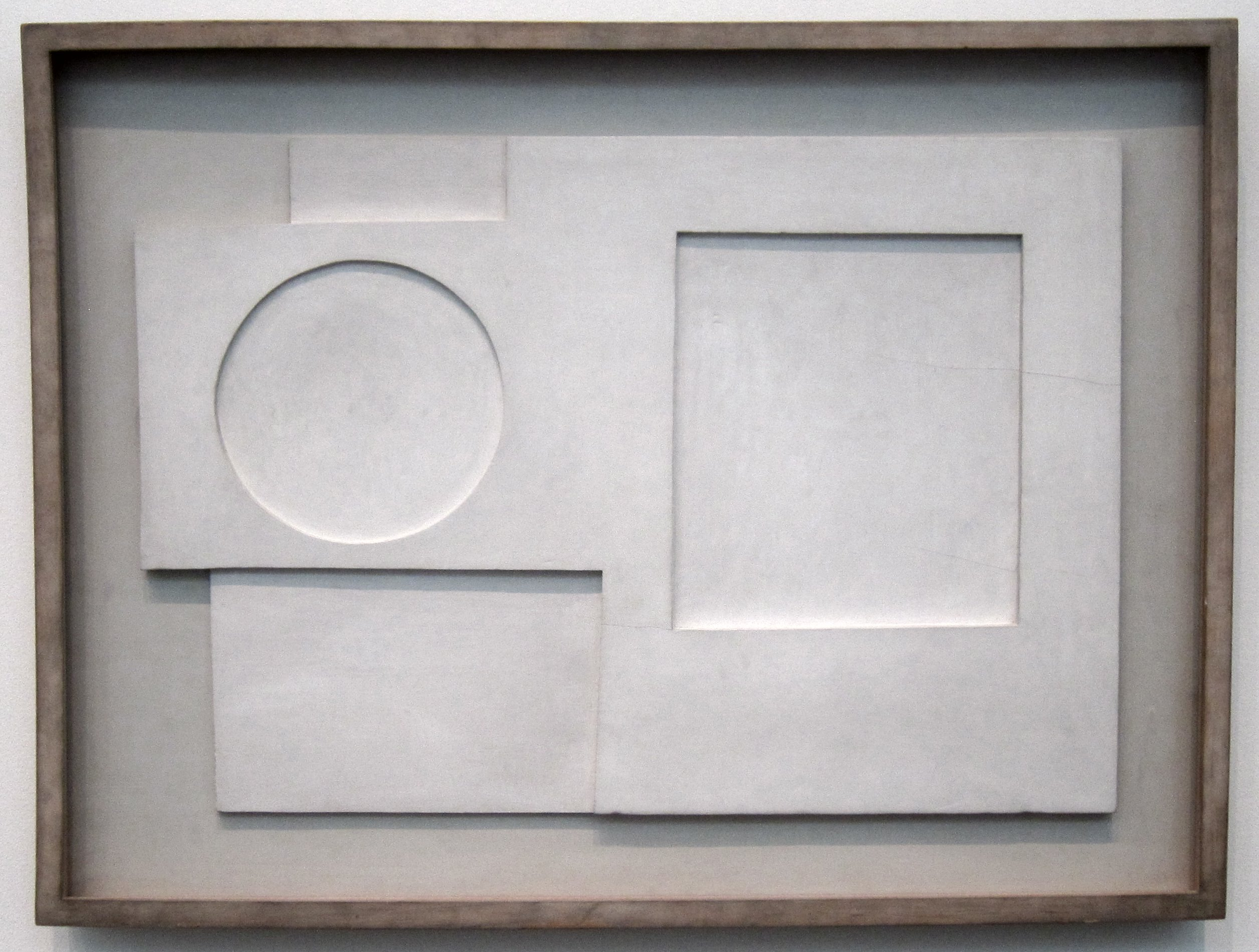
1934 (relief), Tate Modern, London

Benjamin Lauder Nicholson, OM (10 April 1894 – 6 February 1982) was an English painter and sculptor of abstract compositions (sometimes in low relief), landscapes, and still-life. He was one of the leading promoters of abstract art in England.

== Background and training ==
Nicholson was born on 10 April 1894 in Denham, Buckinghamshire, the son of the painters Sir William Nicholson and Mabel Pryde, and brother of the artist Nancy Nicholson, the architect Christopher Nicholson and Anthony Nicholson. His maternal grandmother Barbara Pryde (née Lauder) was a niece of the famous artist brothers Robert Scott Lauder and James Eckford Lauder. The family moved to London in 1896. Nicholson was educated at Tyttenhangar Lodge Preparatory School, Seaford, at Heddon Court, Hampstead and then as a boarder at Gresham's School, Holt, Norfolk. He trained as an artist in London at the Slade School of Fine Art between 1910 and 1911, where he was a contemporary of Paul Nash, Stanley Spencer, Mark Gertler, and Edward Wadsworth. According to Nash, with whom he formed a close friendship, Nicholson spent more time during his year at the Slade playing billiards than painting or drawing, since the abstract formality of the green baize and the constantly changing relationships of the balls were, he later claimed, of more appeal to his aesthetic sense.

Nicholson was married three times. His first marriage was to the painter Winifred Roberts; it took place on 5 November 1920 at St Martin-in-the-Fields Church, London. Nicholson and Winifred had three children: a son, Jake, in June 1927; a daughter, Kate (who later also became a painter), in July 1929; and a son, Andrew, in September 1931. They were divorced in 1938. His second marriage was to fellow artist Barbara Hepworth on 17 November 1938 at Hampstead Register Office. Nicholson and Hepworth had triplets, two daughters, Sarah and Rachel, and a son, Simon, in 1934. They were divorced in 1951. The third and final marriage was to Felicitas Vogler, a German photographer. They married in July 1957 and divorced in 1977.

== Life and works ==
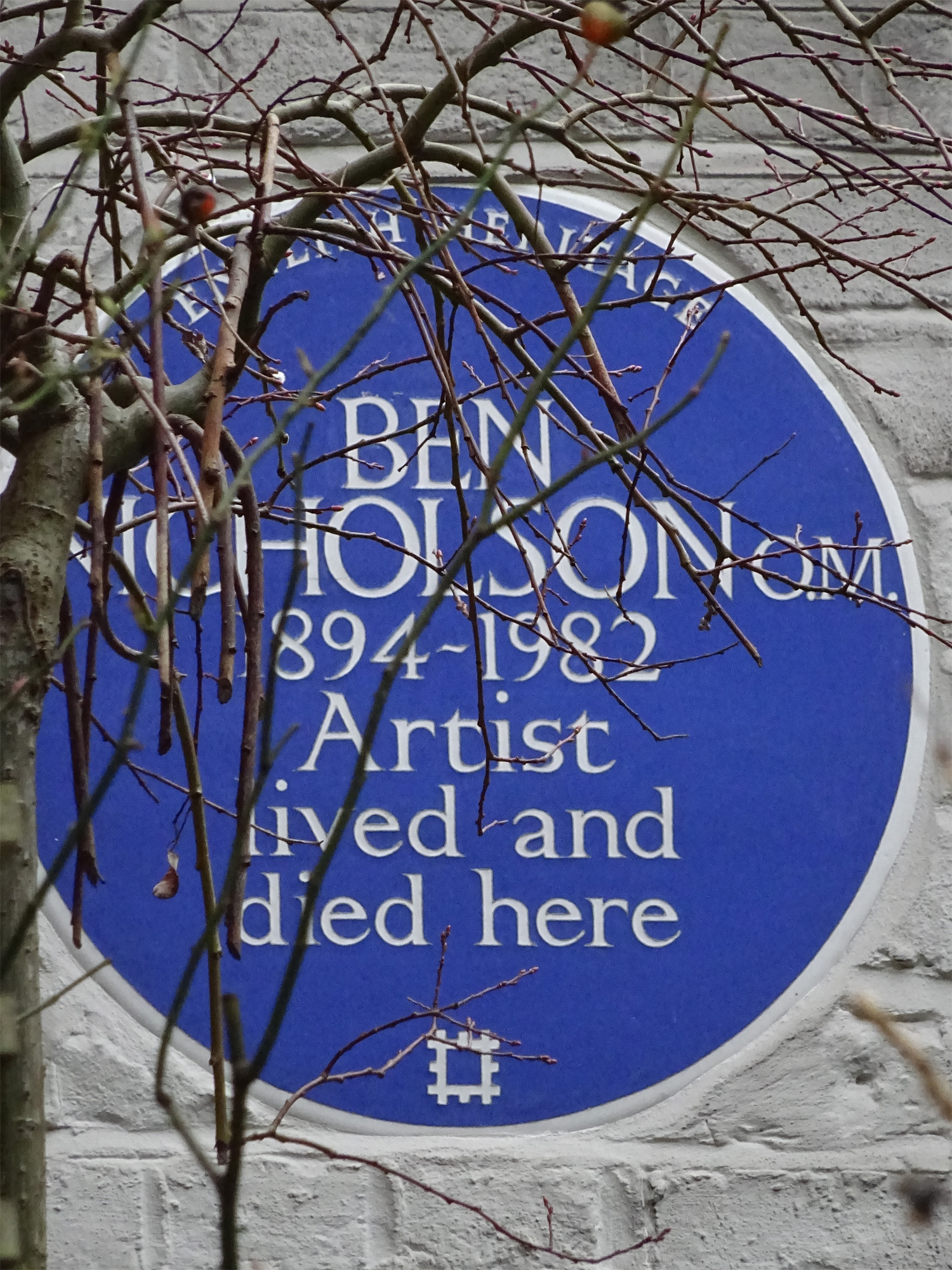
English Heritage blue plaque at 2B Pilgrims Lane, Hampstead

Nicholson's first notable work was following a meeting with the playwright J. M. Barrie on holiday in Rustington, Sussex, in 1904. As a result of this meeting, Barrie used a drawing by Nicholson as the base for a poster for the play Peter Pan; his father William designed some of the sets and costumes.

Nicholson was exempted from World War I military service due to asthma. He travelled to New York in 1917 for an operation on his tonsils, then visited other American cities, returning to Britain in 1918. Before he returned, Nicholson's mother died in July of influenza and his brother Anthony Nicholson was killed in action.

From 1920 to 1933, he was married to the painter Winifred Nicholson and lived in London. After Nicholson's first exhibition of figurative works in London in 1922, his work began to be influenced by Synthetic Cubism, and later by the primitive style of Rousseau. In 1926, he became chair of the Seven and Five Society.

In London, Nicholson met the sculptors Barbara Hepworth (to whom he was married from 1938 to 1951) and Henry Moore. On visits to Paris, he met Mondrian, whose work in the neoplastic style was to influence him in an abstract direction, and Picasso, whose cubism would also find its way into his work. His gift, however, was the ability to incorporate these European trends into a new style that was recognizably his own. He first visited St Ives, Cornwall, in 1928 with his fellow painter Christopher Wood, where he met the fisherman and painter, Alfred Wallis. In Paris in 1933, he made his first wood relief, White Relief, which contained only right angles and circles. In 1937, he was one of the editors of Circle, an influential monograph on constructivism. He believed that abstract art should be enjoyed by the general public, as shown by the Nicholson Wall, a mural he created for the garden of Sutton Place in Guildford, Surrey. Nicholson moved to St Ives in 1939, living at Trezion, Salubrious Place, for 19 years. In 1943, he joined the St Ives Society of Artists. In 1951 he and Barbara Hepworth divorced.

He won the prestigious Carnegie Prize in 1952 and in 1955 a retrospective exhibition of his work was shown at the Tate Gallery in London. In 1956, he won the first Guggenheim International painting prize and in 1957 the international prize for painting at the São Paulo Art Biennial.

Nicholson married the photographer Felicitas Vogler in 1957 and moved to Castagnola, Switzerland, in 1958. In 1968, he received the British Order of Merit (OM). In 1971, he separated from Vogler and moved to Cambridge. In 1977, they divorced.

Nicholson's last home was in Pilgrims Lane, Hampstead. He died there on 6 February 1982 and was cremated at Golders Green Crematorium on 12 February 1982.

== Art market ==
The highest price reached by one of his paintings in the art market was when April 57 (Arbia 2) (1957) sold for £3,749,000 (c. $4,659,407) at Christie's London, on 23 November 2016.

== Public collections ==
Some of Nicholson's works can be seen at the Tate Gallery, Tate St Ives, Kettle's Yard Art Gallery in Cambridge, The Hepworth Wakefield, Pallant House Gallery, in Chichester, and the Pier Arts Centre, in Stromness, Orkney.
