= James Pryde =

British artist

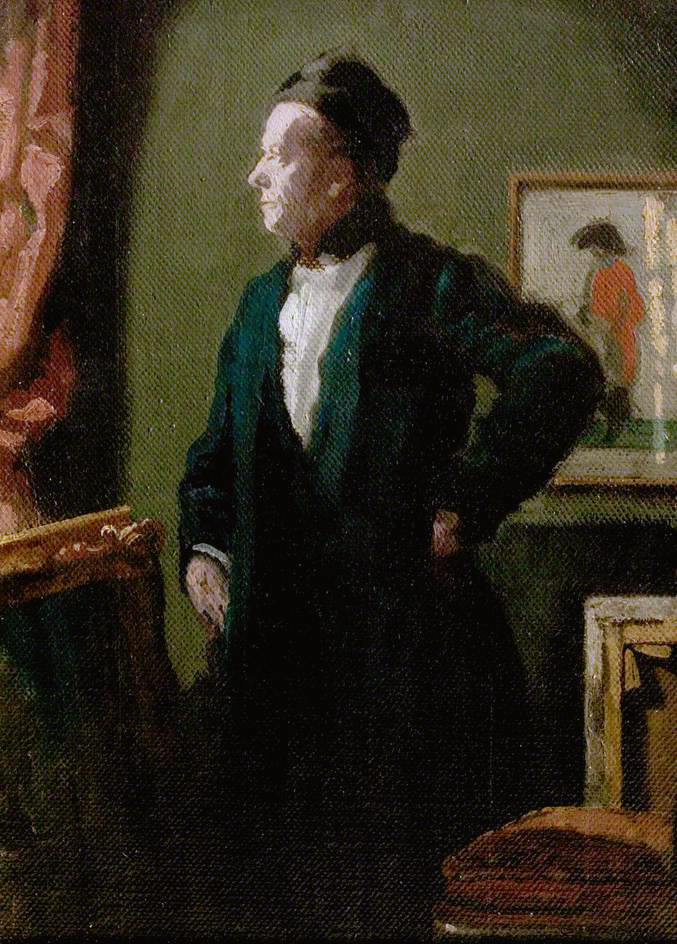
- James Pryde, self-portrait as Paul Scarron, oil on canvas, Nottingham Castle Museum and Art Gallery
- Born: James Ferrier Pryde; 30 March 1866; Edinburgh, Scotland
- Died: 24 February 1941; Kensington, London, England
- Spouse: Marian Symons
- Children: 1
- Relatives: Mabel Pryde (sister); Robert Scott Lauder (uncle); James Eckford Lauder (uncle)

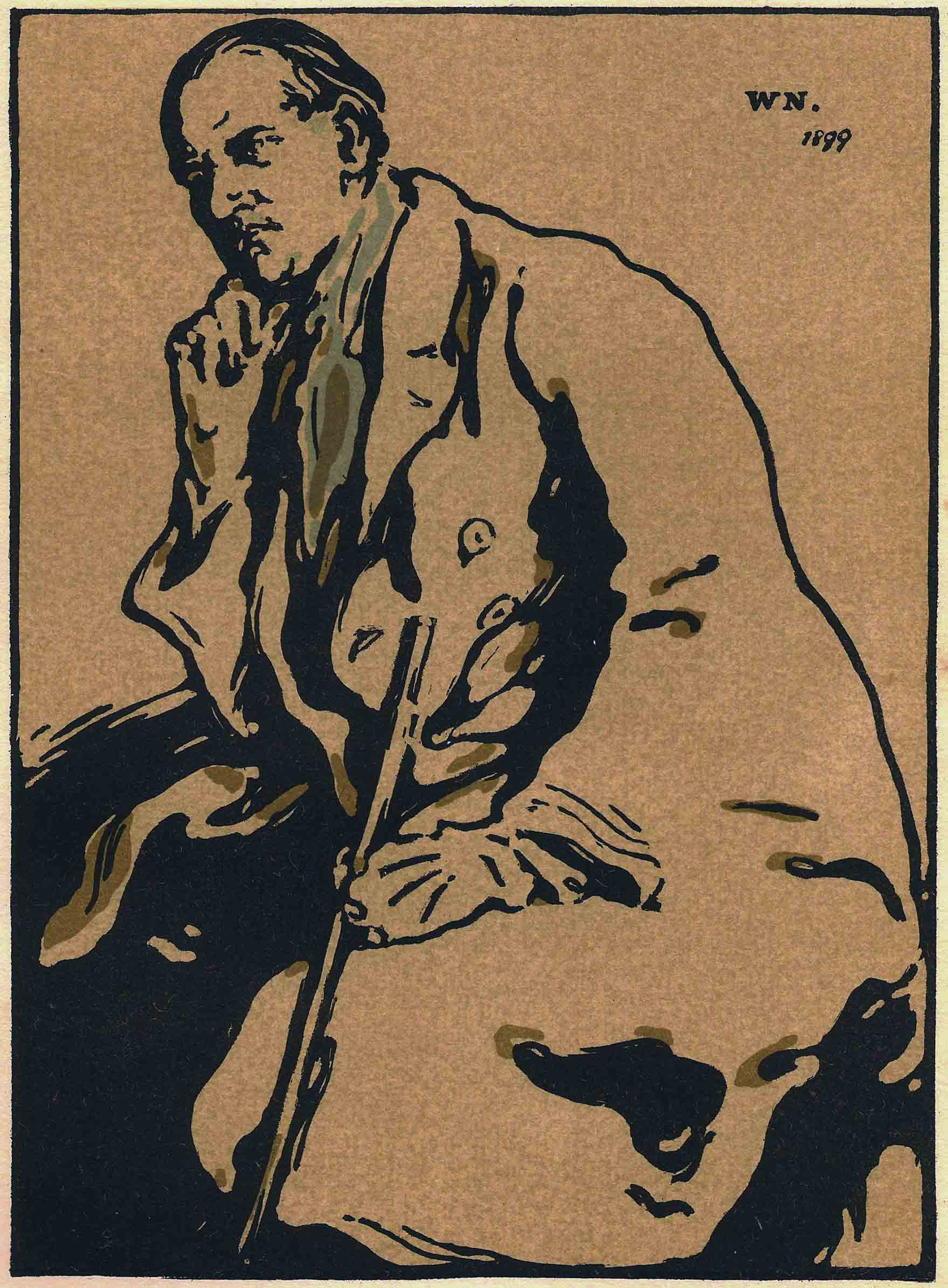
Portrait of James Pryde by William Nicholson, woodcut, 1899; published in The Studio, July 1901

James Ferrier Pryde (30 March 1866 – 24 February 1941) was a British artist. A number of his paintings are in public collections, but there have been few exhibitions of his work. He is principally remembered as one of the Beggarstaffs, his artistic partnership with William Nicholson, and for the poster designs and other graphic work they made between 1893 and 1899, which influenced graphic design for many years.

== Life ==
James Ferrier "Jimmy" Pryde was born at 23 London Street, Edinburgh, on 30 March 1866. He was the only son of the six children of David Pryde (1834–1907), who was headmaster of Edinburgh Ladies' College from 1870 to 1891, and his wife Barbara née Lauder (born 1833 or 1834), whose father William was a brother of the famous Scottish artists Robert Scott Lauder and James Eckford Lauder. The family moved to 10 Fettes Row, Edinburgh, in 1872. Pryde attended George Watson's Boys' College, and from 1885 to 1888 studied at the Royal Scottish Academy, where he had first exhibited in 1884. He was encouraged to paint by the Glasgow school painters James Guthrie and Edward Arthur Walton. In about 1899 he went to Paris to study under William-Adolphe Bouguereau at the Académie Julian, but the dismal and crowded atelier with its smell of tobacco smoke, stove-oil and human sweat did not please him, and after three months he returned to Scotland. In 1890 he went to London, and began to make pastel drawings in a style influenced by that of James McNeill Whistler.

In 1899 Pryde married Marian Symons, a musician; their daughter Betty was born in 1903. The marriage ended in separation in 1914.

== Work ==
In 1893 his sister Mabel married William Nicholson, four years after the two had met while studying at Hubert Herkomer's school of art in Bushey, in Hertfordshire. In the same year Pryde and Nicholson formed the Beggarstaff partnership, which lasted until 1899, and produced innovative poster designs and signboards.

Between 1894 and 1899 Pryde tried his hand as an actor, playing small parts in several plays. Ellen Terry's son Edward Gordon Craig, with whom Pryde toured Scotland in 1895, described 'Jimmy' as 'one of the best painters who ever lived' and 'one of the biggest hearts on earth'. But Craig had no illusions about Pryde's dramatic ability:

as an actor he never really existed: but the idea of acting, the idea of the theatre – or rather the smell of the place, meant a lot to him. Yes, I think he got much 'inspiration' from the boards – and the thought and feel of it all, as of a magical place ...

He was an associate of the International Society of Sculptors, Painters and Gravers from 1901 and vice-president in 1921. His first one-man exhibition was held at the Baillie Gallery in 1911. He also exhibited at the Goupil Gallery, the Leicester Galleries, the Grosvenor Gallery, London Salon, New English Art Club, Royal Hibernian Academy, Royal Glasgow Institute of the Fine Arts and Royal Scottish Academy. In 1934 he was elected an honorary member of the Royal Institute of Oil Painters.

His only work as a theatre designer was for a production at the Savoy Theatre of Othello in 1930.

He became ill in 1939, and died on 24 February 1941 in St Mary Abbots Hospital in Kensington. He was cremated at Golders Green Crematorium.

== Reception ==
Pryde did not belong to any artistic school or movement. His work was highly regarded in his lifetime; from 1912 he had the patronage of Annie Pearson, wife of Weetman Pearson, and from 1917 known as Viscountess Cowdray.

In 1922 Frank Rutter, in his Some Contemporary Artists, described him as "stupendous". He had only two one-man shows, in 1911 at the Baillie Gallery and in 1933 at the Leicester Galleries. In 1949 an Arts Council Memorial Exhibition toured Edinburgh, Brighton and London. His work as a painter received little subsequent attention until 1992, when an exhibition was held at the Scottish National Gallery of Modern Art in Edinburgh.
