= Hugh Casson =

British architect (1910–1999)

Sir Hugh Casson CH KCVO PRA RDA
- Casson in his office, early 1950s; vintage bromide print by John Gay, in the photograph collection of the National Portrait Gallery
- Born: Hugh Maxwell Casson; 23 May 1910; Hampstead, London, England
- Died: 15 August 1999 (aged 89); Chelsea, London, England
- Occupations: Architect, interior designer, writer and broadcaster
- Spouse: Margaret Casson (m. 1938)
- Children: 3 daughters
- Awards: Albert Medal (1984)
- Elected: President of the Royal Academy, 1975

Sir Hugh Maxwell Casson CH KCVO PRA RDI (23 May 1910 – 15 August 1999) was a British architect, also active as an interior designer, an artist, and a writer and broadcaster on twentieth-century design. He was the director of architecture for the 1951 Festival of Britain. From 1976 to 1984, he was president of the Royal Academy.

== Life ==
Casson was born in London on 23 May 1910, spending his early years in Burma—where his father was posted with the Indian Civil Service—before being sent back to England for education. He was the nephew of the actor Lewis Casson and his wife the actress Sybil Thorndike. Casson was educated at Eastbourne College in East Sussex, then at St John's College, Cambridge (1929–31), where his subject was architecture, after which he spent time at the Bartlett School of Architecture in Bloomsbury, London, and the British School at Athens. He met his future wife, Margaret Macdonald Troup (1913–1999), an architect and designer who taught design at the Royal College of Art, while they were both students. The couple married in 1938 and had three daughters.

== Work ==
Before the Second World War, Casson divided his time between teaching at the Cambridge School of Architecture and working in the London office of his Cambridge tutor, Christopher (Kit) Nicholson. He wrote the book New Sights of London in 1938 for London Transport, championing modern architecture within reach of London, while remaining critical of the UK's record in innovative building. "He does not mince his words", commented the Architect and Building News on the cover. During the war, he worked in the Camouflage Service of the Air Ministry.

Casson was appointed to his role as director of architecture of the Festival of Britain on the South Bank in 1948 at the age of 38, and set out to celebrate peace and modernity through the appointment of other young architects. For example, the Modernist design of the Royal Festival Hall was led by a 39-year-old, Leslie Martin. Casson's Festival achievements led to his being made a (Knight Bachelor) in 1952. The following year he designed street decour in Westminster for the Coronation of Elizabeth II.

After the war, and alongside his Festival work, Casson went into partnership with young architect Neville Conder. Their projects included corporate headquarters buildings, university campuses, the Elephant House at London Zoo, a building for the Royal College of Art (where Casson was Professor of Interior Design from 1955 to 1975, and later served as Provost), the Microbiology Building (Belfast), and the master planning and design of the Sidgwick Site arts faculty buildings for the University of Cambridge, including the Austin Robinson Building which houses the Faculty of Economics as well as the Marshall Library of Economics. This latter project lasted some thirty years.

Casson was a friend of members of the British royal family and is reported to have taught watercolour painting to Prince Charles. In 1955, he designed the interiors for the new royal yacht Britannia. He also designed interiors for suites at Buckingham Palace and Windsor Castle, as well as overseeing the team of designers and artists responsible for the interiors of P&O’s Canberra.

From 1953 to 1975, he was professor of environmental design at the Royal College of Art, where his wife Margaret was senior tutor.

In the 1980s Casson became a television presenter, with his own series, Personal Pleasures with Sir Hugh Casson, about stately homes and places he enjoyed.

Casson supplied watercolour illustrations for a new edition of Sir John Betjeman's verse autobiography Summoned by Bells (1960); The Illustrated "Summoned by Bells" was published by John Murray in 1989.

== Reception ==
After his work for the Festival of Britain, Casson was knighted in the New Year Honours of 1952. He was made a Knight Commander of the Royal Victorian Order in 1978, and a Member of the Order of the Companions of Honour in 1985.

He was elected an associate member of the Royal Academy in 1962, and a full member in 1970. He was treasurer in 1975–1976, and president from 1976 to 1984. During the Summer Exhibition the academy awards an annual Hugh Casson Drawing Prize "for an original work on paper in any medium, where the emphasis is clearly on drawing", and a room in the Keeper's House is named after him.

From 1982 to 2017 Private Eye magazine gave the Sir Hugh Casson Award, a spoof honour, to the "Worst New Building of the Year". Its name reflects Casson's reputation as an "establishment" modernist architect who cosied up to the royal family, and was known as "Cash-in" to his detractors.

An archive of Casson's papers is held by the Victoria & Albert Museum. Photographs attributed to him are held in the Conway Library at the Courtauld Institute of Art, London, whose archive, of primarily architectural images, is being digitised under the wider Courtauld Connects project.

== Selected publications ==
- Hugh Casson's Oxford, London : Phaidon, 1998, ISBN 0714838101
- Hugh Casson's Cambridge, London : Phaidon, 1992, ISBN 0714824593
- Hugh Casson's London, London : Dent, 1983, ISBN 0460045911
- The Tower of London : an artist's portrait, with additional text ("An historian's viewpoint") by Richard White, London : Herbert Press in association with HM Tower of London, 1993, ISBN 1871569451
- Sketch book : a personal choice of London buildings, drawn 1971-1974 with introduction by John Betjeman, London : Lion and Unicorn Press, 1975, ISBN 0902490206
- Diary, Hugh Casson, London : Macmillan, 1981, ISBN 0333311124
- Nanny Says, as recalled by Sir Hugh Casson and Joyce Grenfell, ed. Diana, Lady Avebury, London : Dobson, 1972, ISBN 023477715X
- Bridges, London : Chatto, 1963.
- Monuments, London : Chatto, 1963.
- Red Lacquer Days. An illustrated journal describing a recent journey to Peking, London : Lion & Unicorn Press, 1956
- An Introduction to Victorian Architecture, London : Art and Technics, 1948
- Homes by the Million. An account of the housing achievement in the U.S.A., 1940-1945, Harmondsworth : Penguin, 1946
- New Sights of London: The Handy Guide to Contemporary Architecture, London : Westminster : London Transport Publications, 1938

Casson also illustrated many books; perhaps the most famous being The Old Man of Lochnagar, HRH The Prince of Wales with illustrations by Sir Hugh Casson, London : Hamilton, 1980, ISBN 0241111455

Casson's biography was published in 2000.

Cultural offices
Preceded by Sir Thomas Monnington	President of the Royal Academy; 1976–84	Succeeded by Roger de Grey
