= Mabel Pryde =

English artist (1871–1918)

- Portrait of Mabel Pryde 1897, by William Nicholson
- Born: Mabel Scott Lauder Pryde; 12 February 1871; Edinburgh, Scotland
- Died: July 1918 (aged 47); London, England
- Known for: painting
- Spouse: William Nicholson (m. 1893)
- Children: Ben; Anthony; Nancy; Christopher
- Relatives: James Pryde (brother); Kate Nicholson (granddaughter); Simon Nicholson (grandson); Robert Scott Lauder (uncle); James Eckford Lauder (uncle)

Mabel Scott Lauder Pryde (12 February 1871 – July 1918) was a Scottish artist, the wife of artist William Nicholson, and the mother of artists Ben Nicholson and Nancy Nicholson and the architect Christopher Nicholson.

== Life ==
She was the daughter of David Pryde, headmaster of Edinburgh Ladies College 1870–1891, and Barbara Lauder, whose father William was a brother of the famous Scottish artists Robert Scott Lauder and James Eckford Lauder. Mabel had one brother, the artist James Pryde. As children, they lived at 10 Fettes Row, a north-facing Edinburgh house.

Pryde trained at the Bushey School of Art in Hertfordshire under the tutelage of Hubert von Herkomer. Here she met fellow student William Nicholson, whom she married in 1893. She introduced Nicholson to her brother James and all three moved to the Eight Bells, a former pub in Denham, in Buckinghamshire.

Pryde and Nicholson had four children: Ben (1894–1982); Anthony (1897–1918), killed in action during the First World War; Annie Mary "Nancy" (1899–1978); and Christopher "Kit" (1904–1948). They moved to Rottingdean in 1909. In July 1918, Pryde died from influenza during the 1918 flu pandemic.

== Work ==
Pryde exhibited under her married name in several group shows in London, culminating in a solo show at the Chenil Gallery in 1912. Her work is included in the collections of the Tate Museum, London and the National Galleries of Scotland. In addition, there was an exhibition of her work at her former home, The Grange, Rottingdean in 2024.

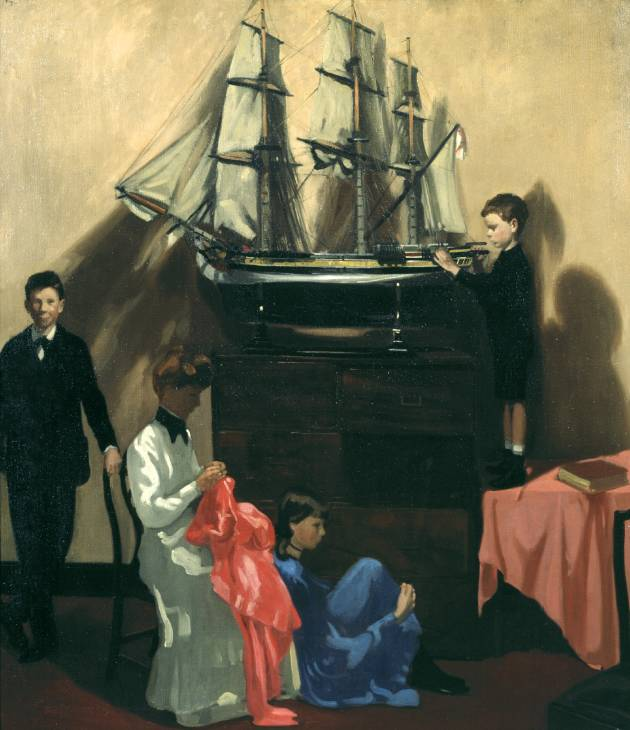
Family Group, Tate

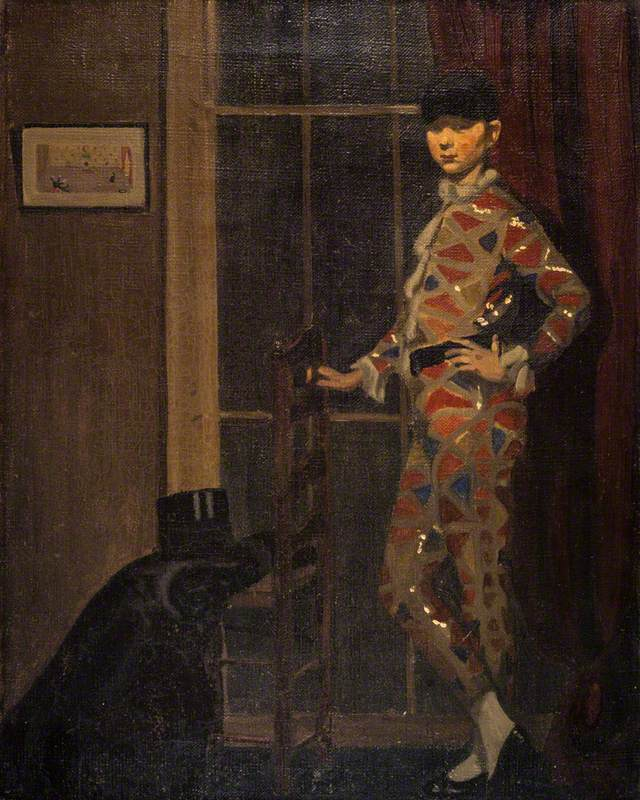
Harlequin with Chair, National Galleries of Scotland

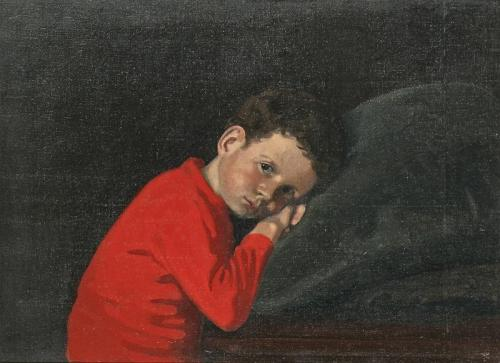
The Red Jersey, Aberdeen Art Gallery
