= Lermontova =

Lermontova is a surname. Notable people with the surname include:

- Ekaterina Lermontova (1899–1942), Russian paleontologist responsible for creating the first Cambrian stratigraphy
- Julia Lermontova (1846–1919), Russian chemist
- Nadezhda Vladimirovna Lermontova (1885–1921), Russian painter

== See also ==
- Lermontov (disambiguation)
- Lermontovo (disambiguation)
