= Dean Gardens, Edinburgh =

Private communal gardens near Stockbridge, New Town area, Edinburgh, Scotland

Coordinates: 55.954°N 3.213°W

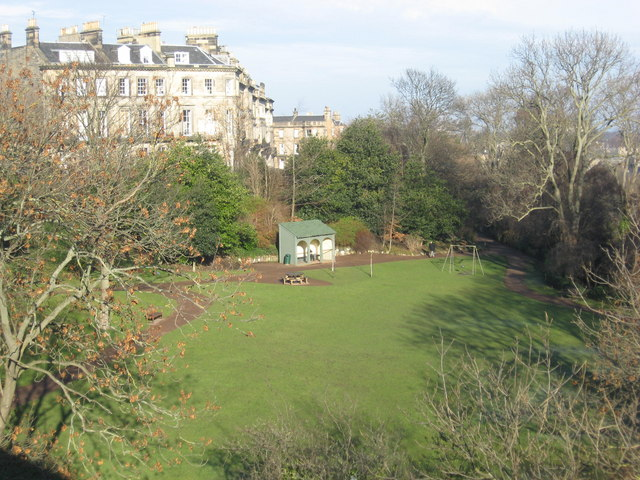
The main lawn of Dean Gardens in February 2009

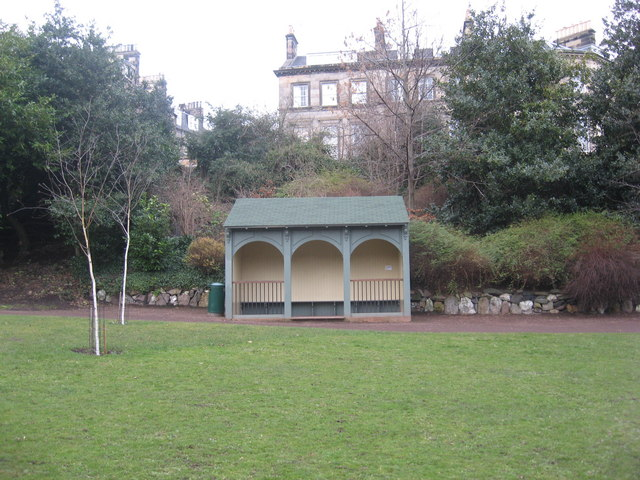
Gazebo in Dean Gardens

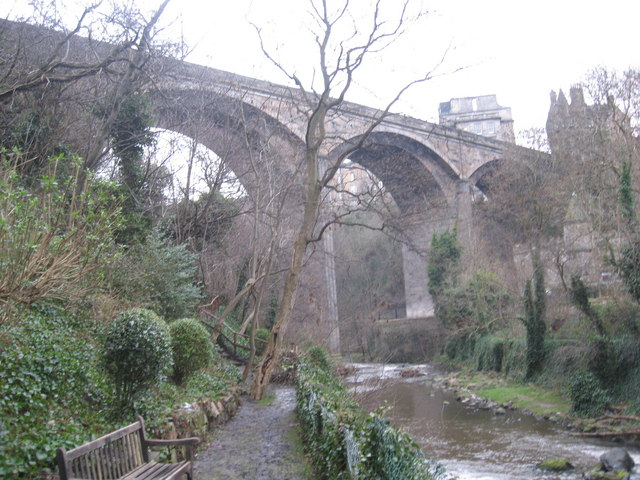
Dean Bridge

The Dean Gardens (previously known as Eton Terrace Gardens) are private communal gardens near the Stockbridge suburb of the New Town area of Edinburgh, EH4. The gardens lie over a 2.9 hectares (7.2 acres) sized site on the steep north bank of the Dean Valley through which runs the Water of Leith. A public view of the gardens can be seen from the Dean Bridge, under which the gardens lie. The gardens have been listed on the Inventory of Gardens and Designed Landscapes as part of the New Town Gardens heritage designation since March 2001.

== Location ==
The Dean Gardens are located on the north bank of the Water of Leith across a steep area of ground lying between the corner of Upper Dean Terrace and Ann Street, bordered by the length of Eton Terrace which overlooks the gardens, with the Dean Bridge on the western extremity of the gardens. The gardens have four entrance gates, three of which are situated on Eton Terrace, with a fourth on the corner of Ann Street and Upper Dean Terrace. The Ann Street corner entrance is the closest to Stockbridge. The first of the Eton Terrace entrances is situated on the corner with Lenox Street, the second is in the middle of the terrace and a third is located at the end of Dean Bridge. The entrance closest to Stockbridge is on the corner of Upper Dean Terrace and Ann Street.

== Access ==
Access to the gardens is only permitted to individuals living at addresses set within a catchment area defined by the garden's management. An annual payment of £115 is required for access with a one-off payment of £30 upon joining. The present membership policy was instigated in 2017 following a large rise in applications. The annual fee stood at £65 in 2003, and £80 in 2007. Pre-existing members were unaffected by the change in membership policy; in addition the membership cannot be inherited by new property owners and is only granted on a personal basis.

Applications for membership are only considered from individuals living on the following streets that surround the gardens:

- Ann Street
- Buckingham Terrace
- Carlton Street
- Clarendon Crescent
- Danube Street
- Dean Park Crescent
- Dean Terrace
- Eton Terrace
- Learmonth Terrace
- Lennox Street
- Lennox Street Lane
- Oxford Terrace
- St Bernard's Crescent
- Upper Dean Terrace

The gardens are part of the open access event Scotland's Gardens and annual public access is granted through the scheme.

== History and design ==
The land on which the Dean Gardens presently stand were used as a grazing ground for sheep until their purchase as part of 140 acres bought by Colonel Alexander Learmonth, the son of the Provost of Edinburgh, John Learmonth, in the middle of the 19th century. Learmouth intended to continue the property development schemes that had seen him construct the terraced housing developments that make up the present Eton Terrace, Oxford Terrace, Belgrave Crescent and Lennox Street. Concerned by the encroaching developments and potential landslips, local residents persuaded Learmonth to grant them a 12-year lease on the site and quickly set to raising the necessary funds for its purchase. Learmonth retained the right to dispose of rubble on the site. £5 was charged to each household and the site of the gardens was eventually bought for £2,500 several years after having opened in 1867. The initial list of plants purchased for the gardens cost £400 and a levy was charged on households to pay for the gardens upkeep and to maintain the debt incurred in the purchase. The debt was finally paid off in 1891. The equivalent of £1.8 million in present money was spent on the creation of the original gardens.

The formal layout of the gardens was designed by the architects John Dick Peddie and James McNab with the majority of the gardens being planted in 1868 by Daniel Mackay and Co. of the Cameron Bank Nursery. The gardens are dominated by two terraces that are joined by various paths and steps; this design has remained largely unchanged since its inception. The gardens have a good view of the classical temple built in 1789 and designed by Alexander Nasmyth that houses the mineral spring of St Bernard's Well on the south bank of the Water of Leith.

The flora in the Dean Gardens are notable for their ornamental bulbs in the Spring with an April 2003 article in The Scotsman newspaper describing the gardens as "swathed in yellow daffodils" and noting the "fine collection of trees, ivies, shrubs and herbaceous plants..." of the gardens.

David Pearson, the youngest son of the prominent 19th-century Scottish accountant Charles Pearson, was the manager of the gardens in the early 20th century.

Twelve elm trees that represented the twelve apostles of Jesus were originally planted in the gardens as gifts from the owners of local townhouses, but these were later part of 38 trees that were cut down due to disease. The felled trees were replaced by beech and elm trees that form a natural border with the Waters of Leith at the bottom part of the gardens. The Dean Village Weir and its former mill buildings can be seen from the extreme west of the gardens under the arches of the Dean Bridge.

A tennis court in the gardens was constructed in the 1870s; with play rationed on the court to an hour during peak times. The wooden pavilion in the gardens dates from this period. The tennis court was later converted into a play area for children.
