= Acmarhachis =

Acmarhachis Temporal range: Upper Cambrian

Scientific classification
- Domain: Eukaryota
- Kingdom: Animalia
- Phylum: Arthropoda
- Class: †Trilobita (?)
- Order: †Agnostida
- Family: †Agnostidae
- Genus: †Acmarhachis; Resser, 1938

Species
- A. typicalis Resser, 1938 (type); A. acuta (Kobayashi, 1938); A. anhuiensis (Qiu, 1983) synonym Wanagnostus anhuiensis; A. apicula Öpik, 1967 synonym Oxyagnostus apicula; A. elegans (Lermontova, 1940) synonym Cyclagnostus elegans Lerm., 1940; A. karatauensis Ergaliev, 1980; A. longispinus Ergaliev, 1980; A. punctatus Ergaliev, 1980; A. whittingtoni Westrop & Eoff, 2012

Synonyms
- Cyclagnostus; Wanagnostus

Trilobite genus

Acmarhachis is a genus of trilobites in the order Agnostida, which lived in what are now Australia (Queensland, Tasmania), Canada (British Columbia, Newfoundland, Northwest Territories), China (Anhui), Kazakhstan, Russia (Kharaulakh), and the US (Alaska, Alabama, Nevada, Maryland, Vermont). It was described by Resser in 1938, and the type species is Acmarhachis typicalis.

== Distribution ==
- A. typicalis occurs in the Cambrian of Kazakhstan (Kyrshabakty River, Lejopyge laevigata-trilobite zone, Zhumabai Formation, Paibian and Cambrian Stage 9, 43.5° N, 70.0° E).
- A. whittingtoni is known from the Upper Cambrian of Canada (Hickey Cove, Dunderbergia-trilobite zone, Downes Point Member, Shallow Bay Formation, Paibian, Newfoundland, 49.8° N, 57.9° W).

== Description ==
Like all Agnostida, Acmarhachis is diminutive and the headshield (or cephalon) and tailshield (or pygidium) are of approximately the same size (or isopygous) and outline. As in all Agnostina, Acmarhachis has two thorax segments. When Agnostina are enrolled, a tiny opening between the cephalon and the thorax becomes visible (the cephalothoracic aperture) that uniquely distinguishes this group from the Eodiscina. A feature shared with all Agnostoidea is that the frontal lobe of the central raised area of the cephalon (or glabella) is not laterally expanded compared to the backward lobe, like in the Condylopygoidea. In Acmarhachis the furrow at midline between the front of the glabella and the border is weak or absent. The glabella has a long ogival to subquadrate front lobe, and the furrow defining it at its back is straight. The back lobe of the glabella is accompanied by two triangular basal lobes of moderate to large size. On the pygidium the axis or rhachis reaches the border. It is divided along its length in three lobes. It is shaped a bit like an amphora, the back pointed and strongly constricted across the middle lobe. The middle lobe also carries a node where it contacts the posterior lobe.
