= Lermontov (disambiguation) =

Mikhail Lermontov (1814–1841) was a Russian poet.

Lermontov may also refer to:

- Lermontov (Russian nobility), the noble family to which Mikhail Lermontov belonged
- Lermontov (town), a town in Stavropol Krai, Russia
  - Lermontov Cup, a tennis tournament held in the town since 2012
  - FC Beshtau Lermontov, former Russian professional football team from Lermontov (1992–2000)
- Lermontov (crater), a crater on Mercury
- Lermontov (film), a 1986 Soviet film by Nikolay Burlyaev
- MS Mikhail Lermontov, a Soviet ocean liner
- 2222 Lermontov, a main-belt asteroid

== See also ==
- Lermontova (disambiguation)
- Lermontovo (disambiguation)
