= Lermontovo =

Lermontovo refers to the Russian poet Mikhail Lermontov.

Places named Lermontovo include:

- Tarkhany estate in Lermontovo, Penza Oblast, Russia
- Lermontovo Microdistrict, part of Kaliningrad Oblast, Russia
- Lermontovo, Armenia

== See also ==
- Lermontov (disambiguation)
- Lermontova (disambiguation)
