= New Town Gardens =

Gardens in Edinburgh, Scotland

Coordinates: 55°57′20″N 3°12′00″W

Designations

Inventory of Gardens and Designed Landscapes in Scotland
- Official name: The New Town Gardens
- Designated: 30 March 2001
- Reference no.: GDL00367

The New Town Gardens are a collection of around 30 mostly private gardens and parks within the Edinburgh New Town Conservation Area spread across the New Town and the West End, listed as a heritage designation since March 2001. The gardens comprise a series of 18th and 19th century town gardens, squares and walks, established contemporaneously with the New Town of Edinburgh between 1767 and around 1850. The gardens typically belong to the town houses and tenement flats that overlook them, and serve as a private outdoor space for the residents who often lack individual back gardens due to the proclivity of drying greens and carriage houses.

== History ==
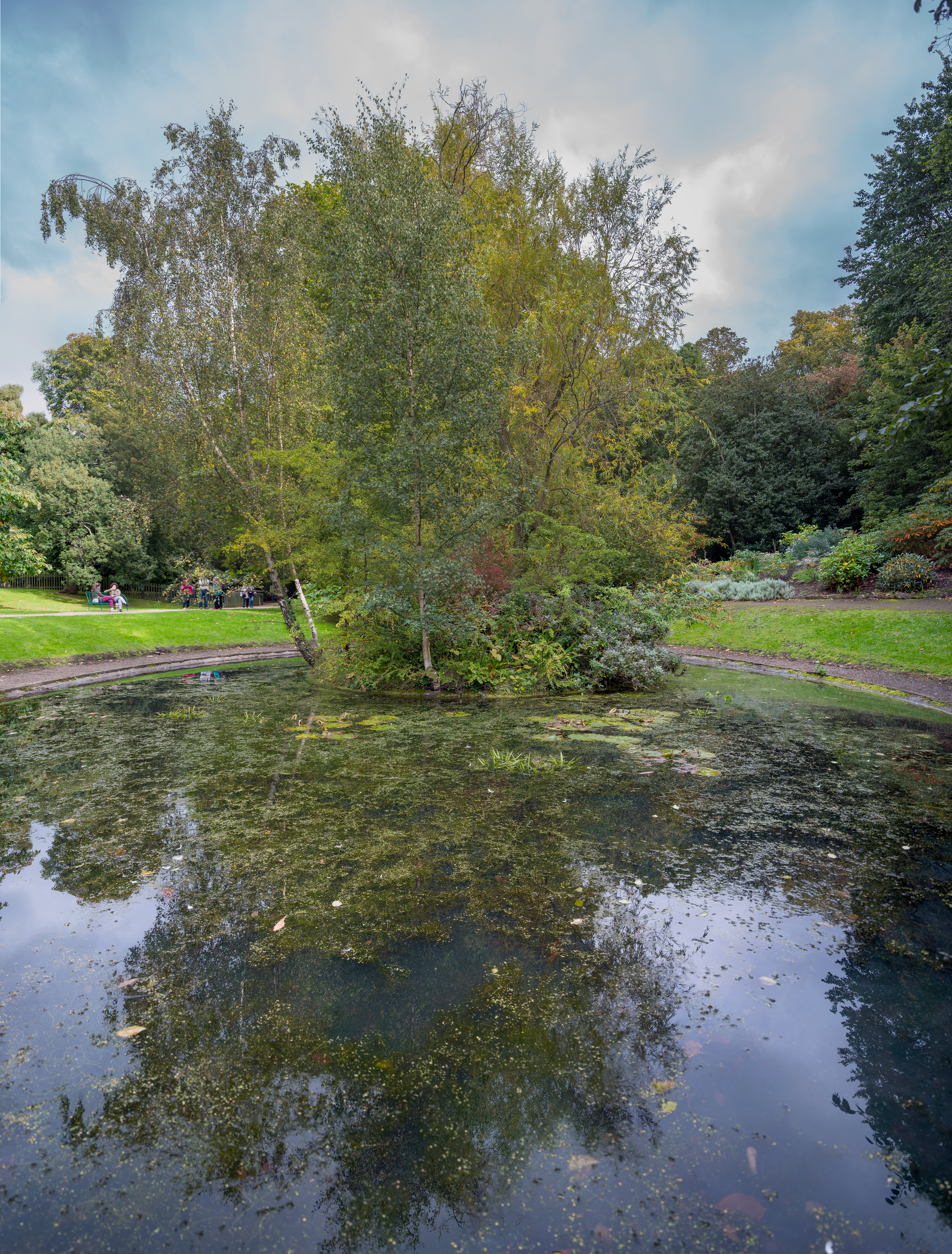
Queen Street Central Gardens

Most of the gardens were established contemporaneously to the New Town, and north West End of Edinburgh.

Some have unique history such as the Hopetoun Crescent Gardens, which were the original site of the Royal Botanic Garden Edinburgh. The Queen Street Central gardens have a pond with an island, said to have inspired Robert Louis Stevenson's Treasure Island.

== Membership and access ==
Each garden has different rules concerning criteria for membership and access, with some permitting only those owning or renting surrounding properties a key, while others welcome applications from residents in other parts of the City of Edinburgh. Some gardens are regularly opened to the public, such as St Andrew Square, while others are only opened to the public on Doors Open Days or not at all.

== Ownership and management ==
Each garden has a different management and ownership structure. Ownership is often by private shareholders or a joint ownership by the local residents. For example, East Queen Street Gardens are owned by shareholders who have explicitly bought a share in the land, and keys are rented to those who apply successfully for access, as a way of bringing in income to the garden. The gardens are then usually managed by Commissioners – around eight for each garden. The Commissioners are elected by the owners, and have responsibility for sourcing gardeners, and ensuring the gardens are well maintained. A Clerk of the gardens usually handles membership applications and entitlement. The Clerk will be a member of a local solicitors firm, with their contact details often on plaques on the gates to the gardens.

Some of the gardens, such as Bellevue Crescent Gardens and Gayfield Square Gardens, are now owned and managed by City of Edinburgh Council.

== List of gardens ==
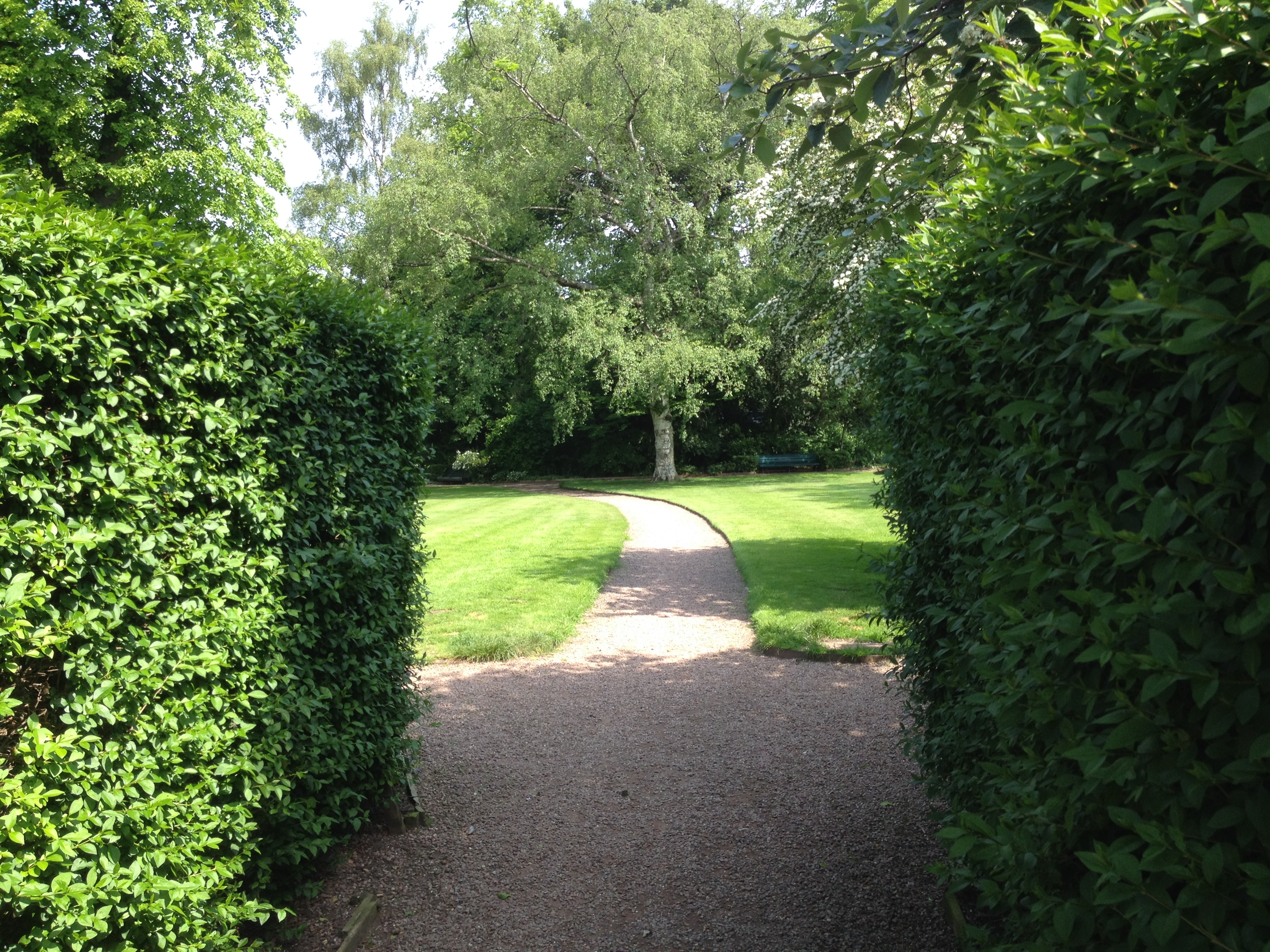
Moray Place Gardens

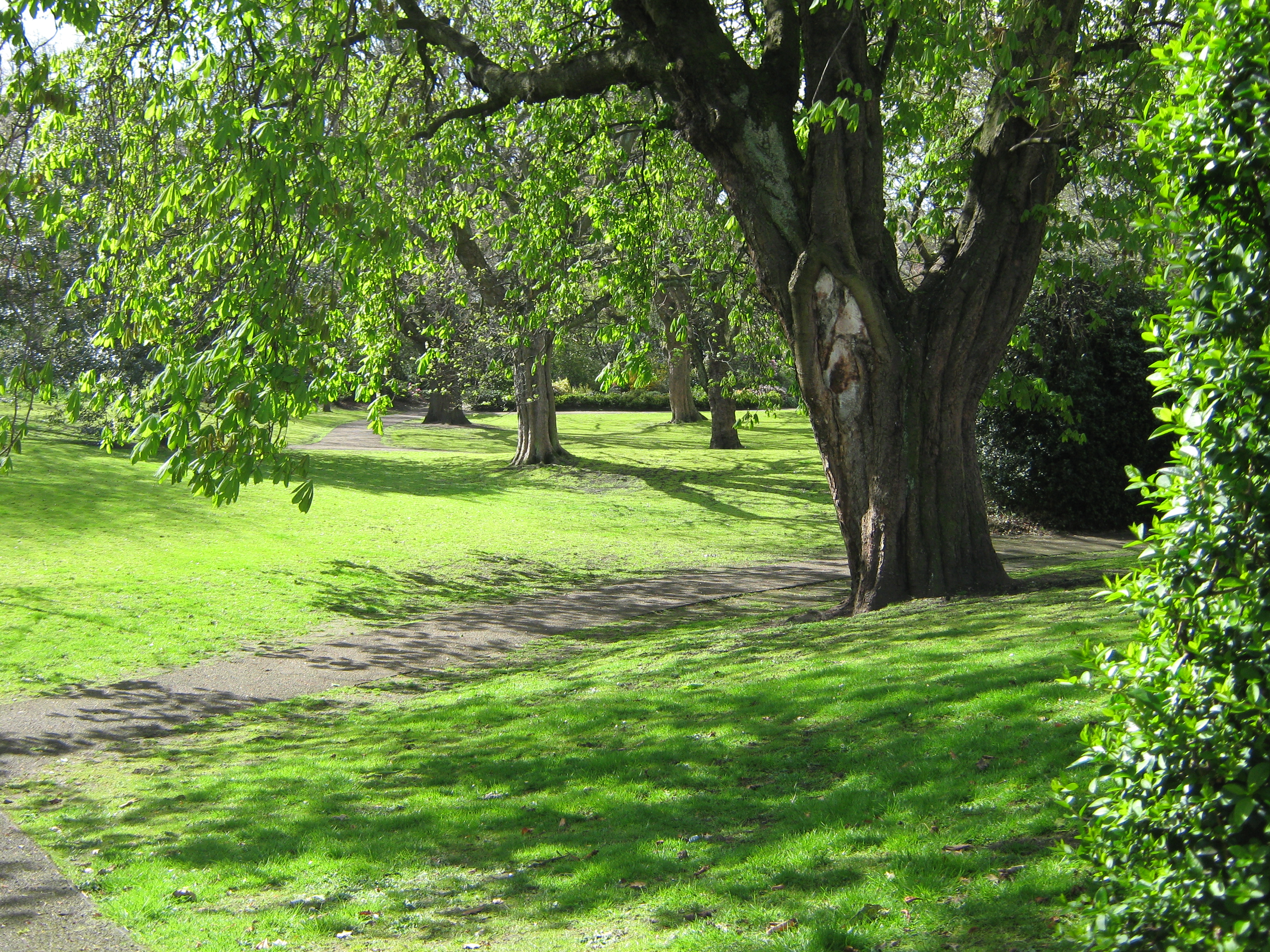
Queen St. Gardens West

- Bellevue Crescent Gardens
- Charlotte Square Gardens
- Claremont Crescent Gardens
- Dean Gardens
- Douglas Crescent Gardens
- Drummond Place Garden
- Drumsheugh Gardens
- East Circus Place Garden
- Eglinton Crescent and Glencairn Crescent Gardens
- Gayfield Square Gardens
- Grosvenor Crescent and Lansdowne Crescent Gardens
- Hillside Crescent Gardens
- Hopetoun Crescent Gardens
- India Street Gardens
- Learmonth Gardens
- London Road Gardens
- Moray Feu Gardens
- Queen Street Central Gardens
- Queen Street Gardens East
- Queen Street Gardens West
- Randolph Crescent Garden
- Regent, Royal and Carlton Terrace Gardens
- Rothesay Terrace Gardens
- Royal Circus Gardens
- Rutland Square Garden
- Saxe-Coburg Place Gardens
- St Andrew Square Gardens
- St. Bernard's Crescent Garden
