= Drumsheugh Baths Club =

Swimming club in Edinburgh, Scotland

Coordinates: 55.9520°N 3.216°W

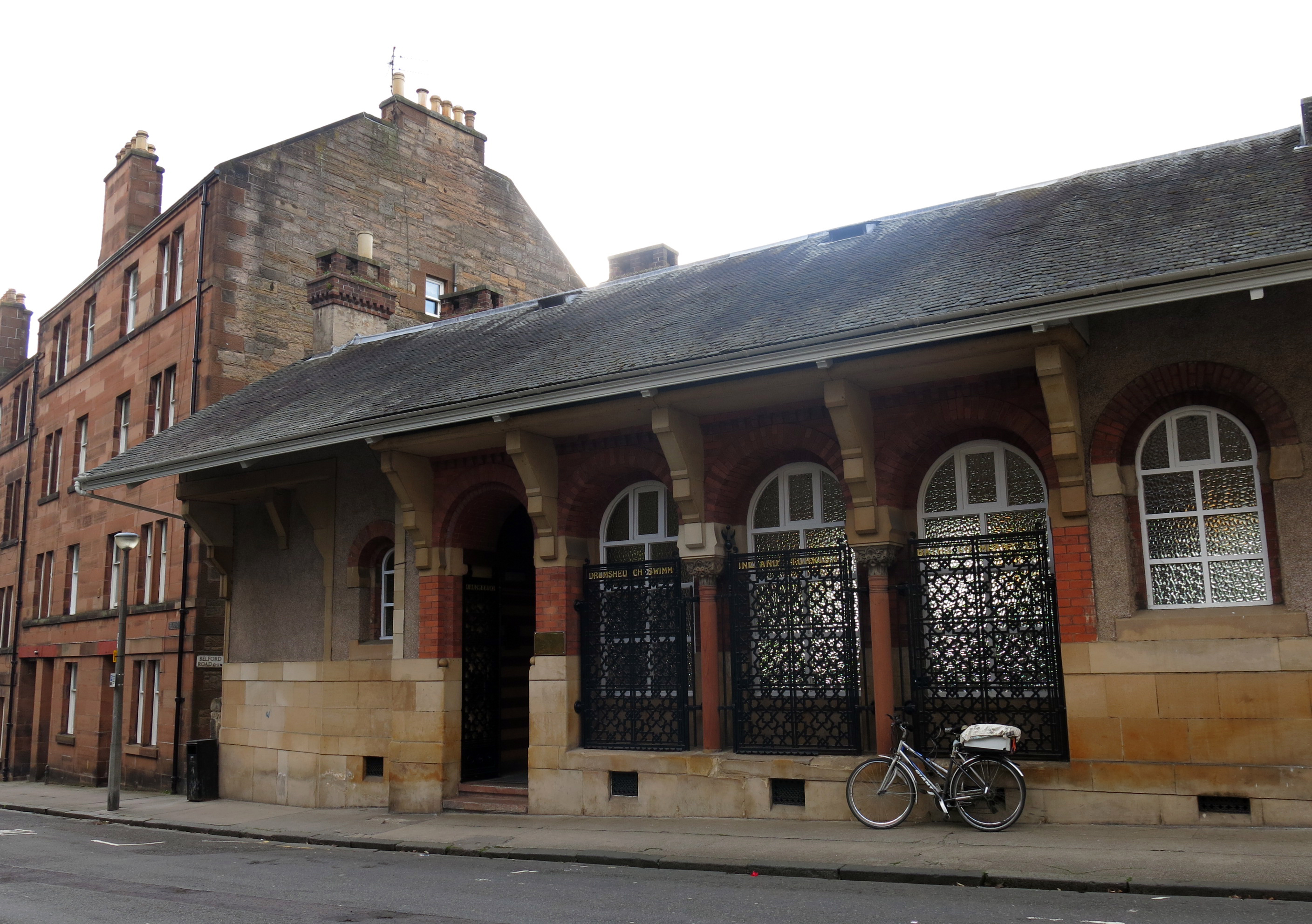
Drumsheugh Baths

The Drumsheugh Baths Club is a private swimming club in the West End of Edinburgh, Scotland founded in 1882 and opened in 1884.

== History ==
Ahead of its opening in 1884 architect Sir John James Burnett was commissioned to design a building on a steeply sloping north facing site in Belford Road, formerly old Queensferry Road. The baths were designed in a Moorish style designed to look like a Hammam, reported as possibly being influenced by Turkish baths that Burnet had seen during his education in Paris, France. This style was popular in Europe in the Victorian era.

The baths are reported as having a "deeply shadowed entrance" under a "low-pitch stone bracketed roof" with "slender Moorish-style columns and arches visible throughout". The 70 ft main pool area is under an "exposed timber roof", with a "mezzanine gallery on the eastern side".

When it first opened in the 1880s, the company's shareholders are reported as including "office clerks, city merchants, spinsters, advocates, doctors, stockbrokers, and soldiers".

In 1892 the building suffered a fire.

When the original company managing the pool went into liquidation the new 'Drumsheugh Baths Club Limited' purchased the pool's assets in 1902 and continue to run the pool to this day.

== Today ==
A number of the baths' original features have been retained, including rings and trapezes above the main pool. The building also has a gymnasium, a sauna, a treatment room, a massage room and a lounge area. The club has around 500 members, and reciprocal memberships with clubs elsewhere in the UK.

The club offers services such as towel and swimwear washing, where towels and swimwear are cleaned and returned to members lockers at the end of each visit.

== See also ==
- Warrender Baths
- Portobello Swim Centre
- Western Baths
- Arlington Baths Club
