= John Learmonth =

- Born: 26 May 1789; Edinburgh
- Died: 17 December 1858 (aged 69); Edinburgh
- Other name: Learmonth of Dean
- Occupation: Lord Provost of Edinburgh

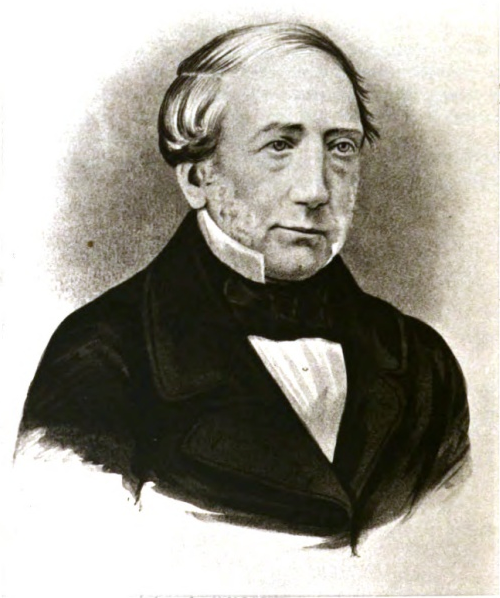
John Learmonth, Lord Provost of Edinburgh

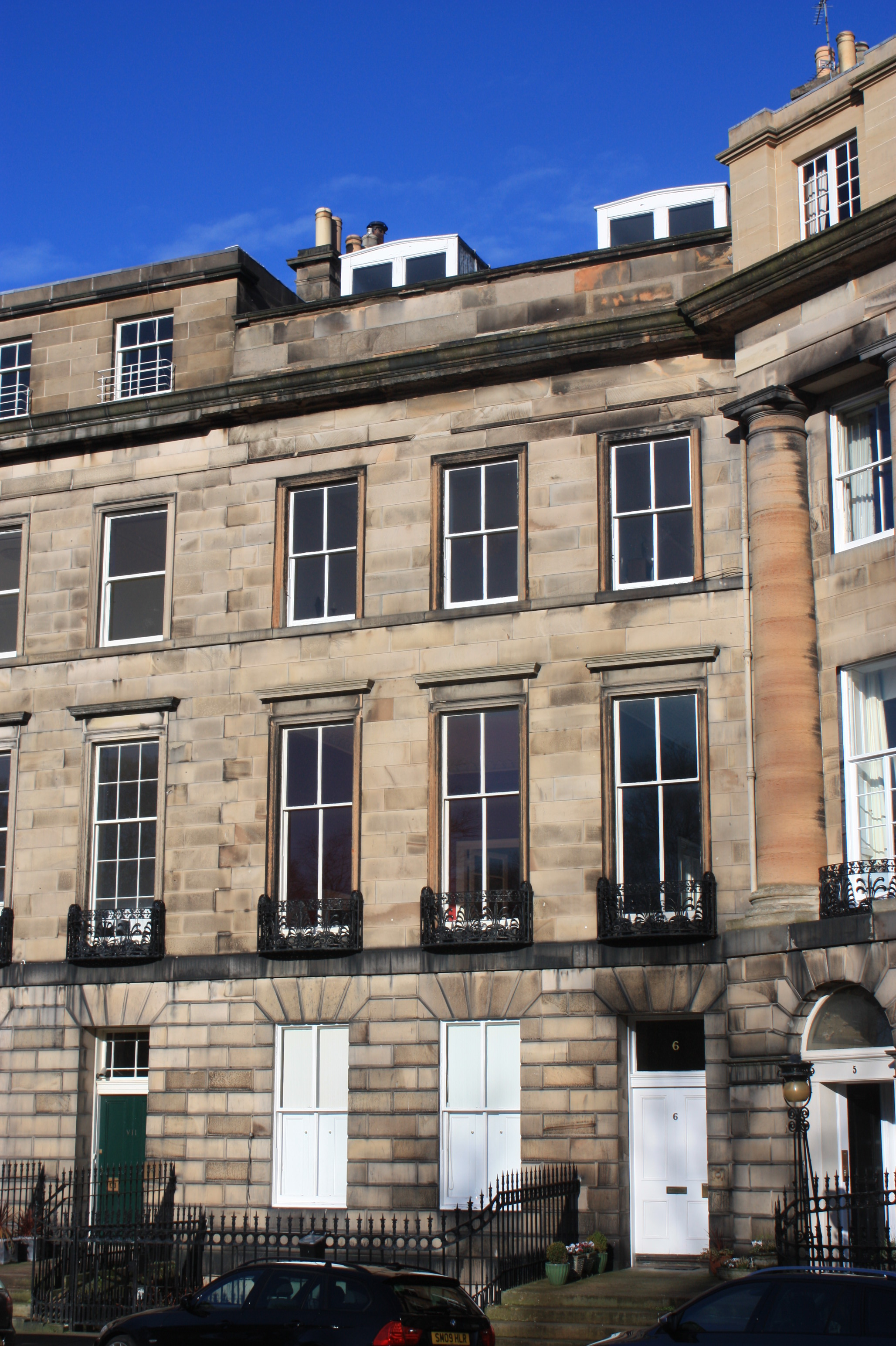
Learmonth's Edinburgh townhouse at 6 Moray Place

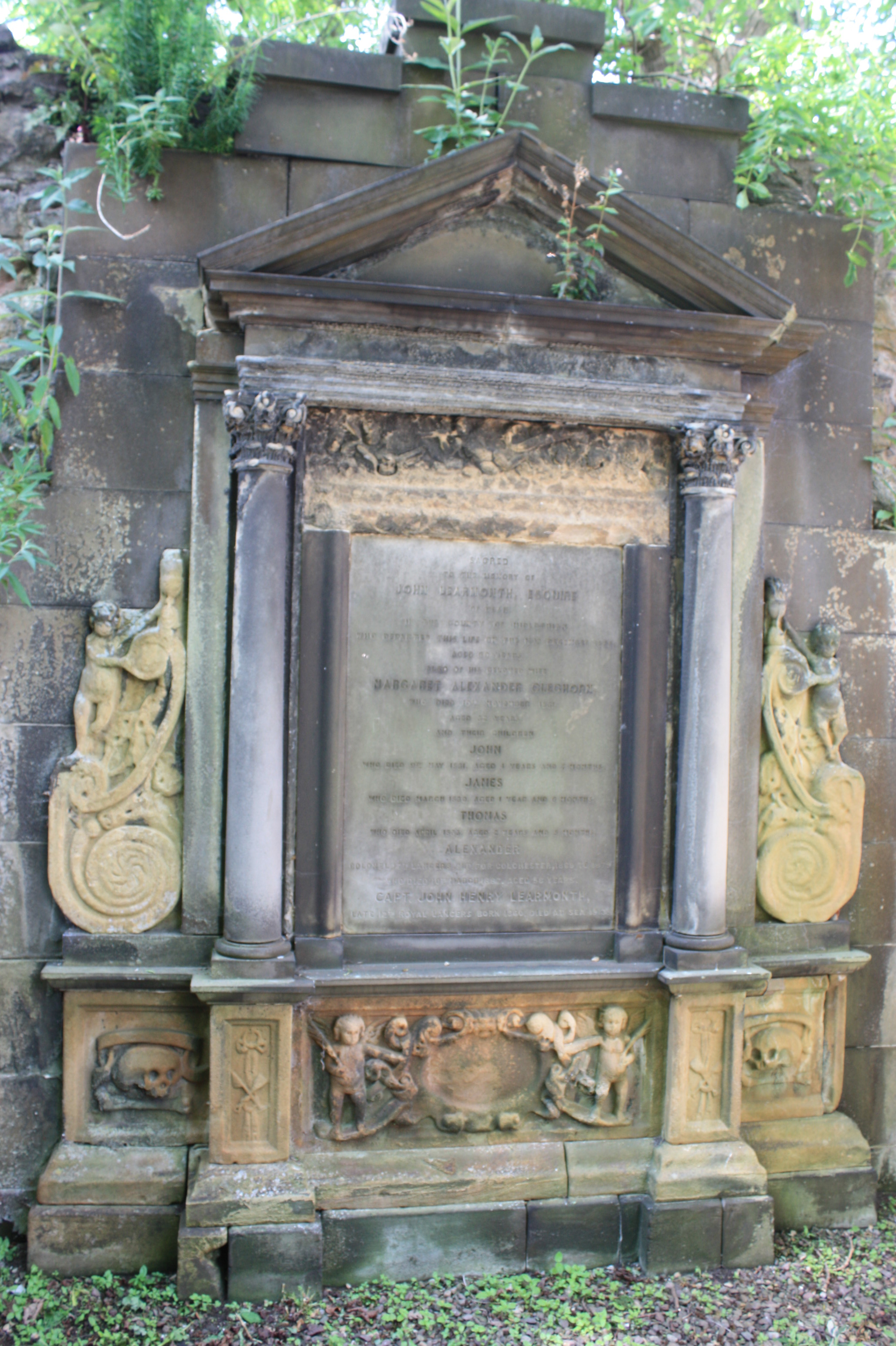
The grave of John Learmonth, Greyfriars Kirkyard, Edinburgh

John Learmonth of Dean, DL FRSE (26 May 1789 – 17 December 1858) was Lord Provost of Edinburgh from 1831 to 1833. He was co-funder of the Dean Bridge project in western Edinburgh and gives his name to many of the streets in Comely Bank, the district to the north-west of the bridge. He was a Tory politician and also chairman of the Edinburgh and Glasgow Railway Company.

== Life ==
He was descended from James Learmonth, Lord Balcomie.

He was born on 26 May 1789 the son of John Learmonth or Learmont, an Edinburgh coach-builder based at 4 Princes Street on the site presently occupied by the Balmoral Hotel, and was a man of independent means before becoming a property speculator and politician, becoming a city Bailie in 1830. His mother was Grace Young (died 1848). His sister Margaret married Sir John Sinclair of Dunbeath.

In 1827 (following the death of Sir John Nisbett of Dean) he purchased the Dean estate to the west of the city. At this time he was living at 38 Charlotte Square but moved to 6 Moray Place in 1830 at the start of his political career, remaining there until death. He also owned a country seat of Murieston House near Mid Calder.

The Dean estate was poorly connected to the existing New Town due to the steep gorge of the Water of Leith. In 1829 he commissioned Thomas Telford to design a huge bridge over the Water of Leith to allow expansion of the city onto lands to the west (much owned by himself). John Gibb of Aberdeen was contracted to build the structure. Charles Atherton was engaged as the resident engineer to oversee the project. His involvement in this major project probably had some bearing on his being elected Lord Provost of Edinburgh in 1833, the year of its completion. In 1840 he was elected a Fellow of the Royal Society of Edinburgh his proposer being Robert Graham.

In 1842 he campaigned for an East Coast railway route from Edinburgh to Berwick and Newcastle, but could not raise sufficient capital.

Due to rival projects the Dean estate was not properly begun until the 1850s when John Tait was commissioned to lay out the area between Ann Street and Queensferry Road. Disappointed by the progress Learmonth sold the land to the Heriot Trust, the main landholder and developer in Edinburgh.

He died at home at 6 Moray Place on 17 December 1858. He is buried in Greyfriars Kirkyard in the south-west section commonly called the Covenanter's Prison.

== Family ==
He was married to Margaret Alexandra Cleghorn (1799–1831) daughter of Dr James Cleghorn of Dublin.

His son (by an earlier marriage) Lt Col Alexander Learmonth (1809–1867) commissioned John Chesser to continue the second phase of the Dean Estate, south of Queensferry Road (Buckingham Terrace, Belgrave Crescent etc.).

His only daughter, Agnes Learmonth (1824-1876) married Captain George Sinclair (1826-1871) of the Bengal Army, third son of Sir John Sinclair of Dunbeath.
