= Dean Bridge =

Bridge in Edinburgh, Scotland

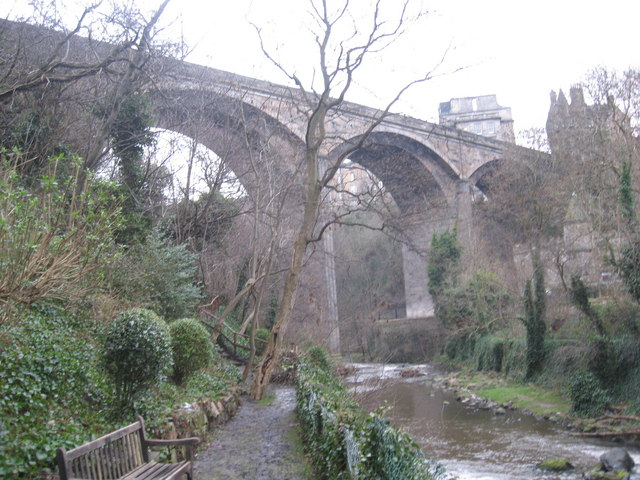
- Bridge across the Water of Leith
- Coordinates: 55.95308°N 3.21434°W
- OS grid reference: NT 24271 74005
- Carries: A90
- Crosses: Water of Leith
- Locale: Edinburgh

Characteristics
- Design: Arch
- Material: Stone
- No. of spans: 4

History
- Construction start: 1829
- Construction end: 1831

Listed Building – Category A
- Official name: Dean Bridge At Queensferry Road
- Designated: 14 June 1965
- Reference no.: LB27941

Location
- Interactive map of Dean Bridge

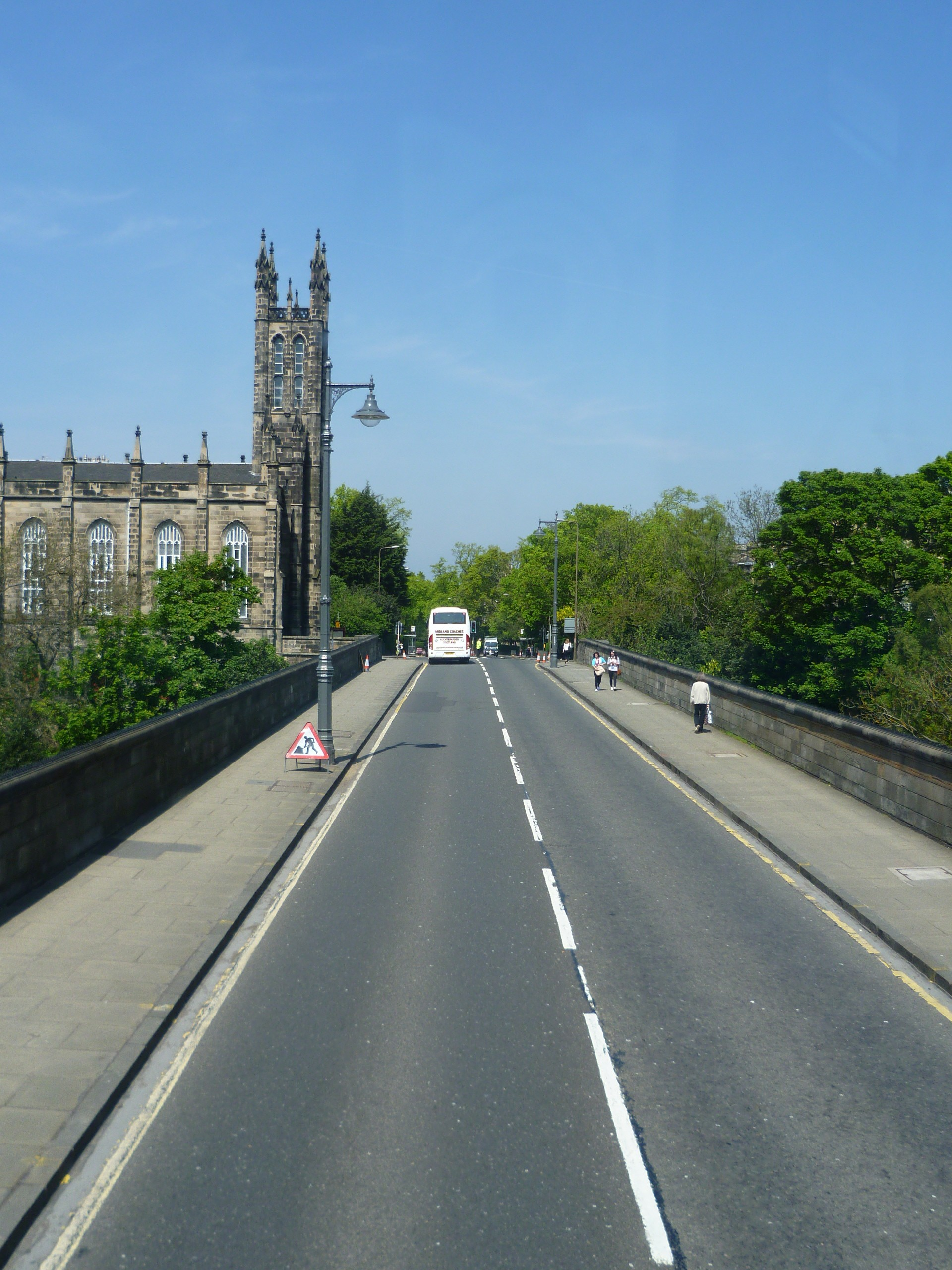
Telford’s bridge carries the bulk of traffic from the city's West End to its north-west suburbs.

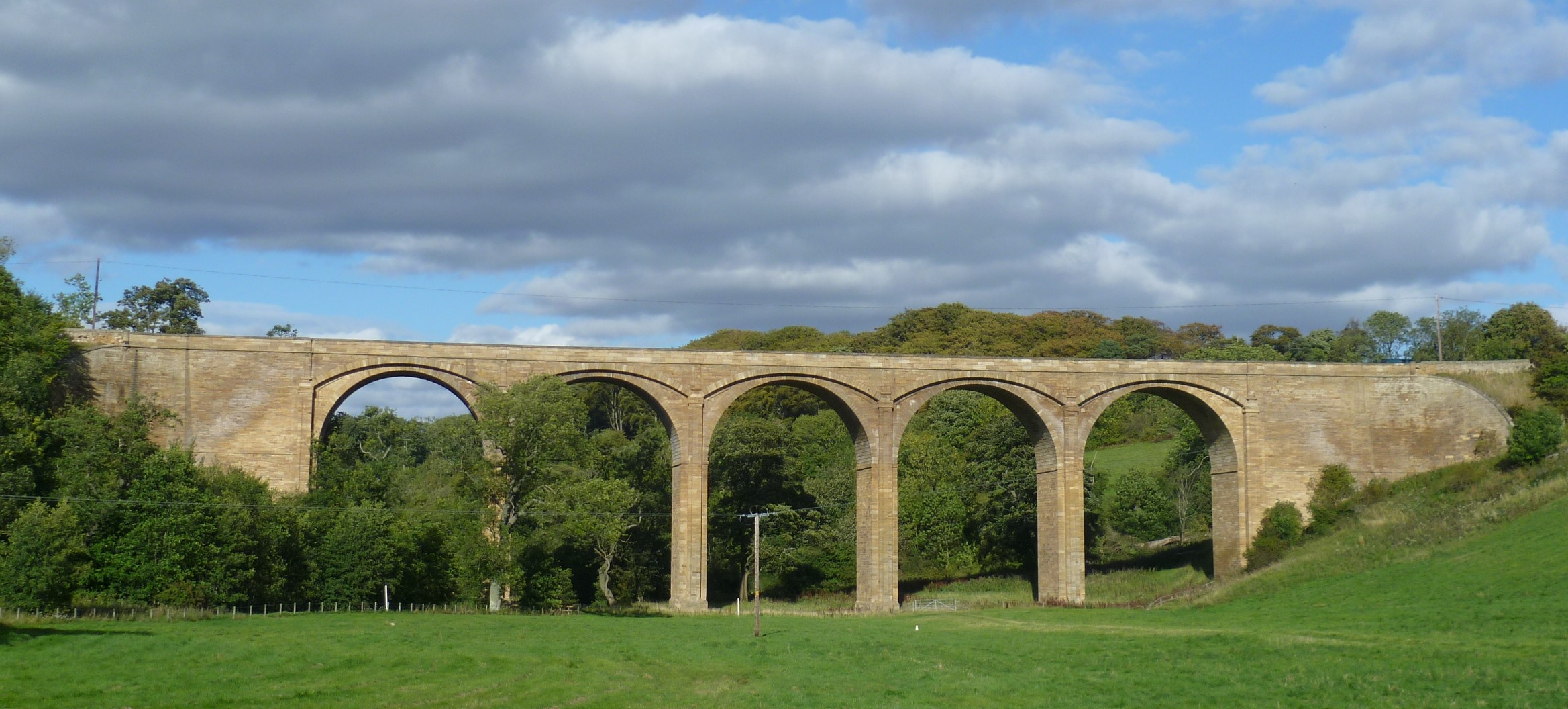
The Dean Bridge is difficult to view as a whole, but Telford's Lothian Bridge on the A68, also from 1831, is a smaller five-arched version of the same design.

The Dean Bridge spans the Water of Leith in the city of Edinburgh on the A90 road to Queensferry on the Firth of Forth. It carries the roadway, 447 feet (136 m) long and 39 feet (12 m) broad, on four arches of 90 feet (27 m) span, rising 106 feet (32 m) above the river bed. The bridge was one of the last major works before retirement of the bridge designer, civil engineer Thomas Telford, and was completed in 1831 when he was seventy-three years old.

Before the bridge was built the river had been crossed since medieval times at a ford, later by a single-arch stone bridge near the same spot, at the foot of Bell's Brae in the Dean Village. The private Dean Gardens lie under the east side of the bridge on the north bank of the Water of Leith. The Water of Leith Walkway passes under the bridge on the south bank.

The Dean Bridge is part of one of the routes proposed in 2025 for the expanded Edinburgh Trams network to Granton.

== Design ==
The design was originally for three arches, but due to poor ground conditions on the south bank, the design was amended to have four smaller arches. The main piers are 31 ft (9.4 m) in length and 3.4 m (11 ft) wide, with the 90 ft (27 m) span arches springing at 70 ft (21 m) above the bed and rising 30 ft (9.1 m). On either side of the bridge is a 5 ft (1.5 m) wide external soffit, with 96 ft (29 m) span arches springing at 90 ft (27 m) above the bed and rising just 10 ft (3.0 m). These, according to Telford, "are the distinguishing features of this bridge". The piers have external walls 3 ft (0.9 m) thick, with four internal voids separated by walls 2 ft (0.6 m) thick.

Weight and cost were saved by building hollow piers, a feature which was initially touted as facilitating their effective inspection; however, these are now considered confined spaces. The arches have four spandrel walls, spanning longitudinally and perpendicular to the deck, rather than being infilled.

== History ==
The original proposal for a new bridge came from John Learmonth, a former Edinburgh Lord Provost and owner of the Dean estate on the north bank of the river. Following the successful expansion of the New Town on Lord Moray's estate on the south bank, Learmonth wanted to feu his land on the north side to create a further extension, but needed a more convenient link to the town over the gorge at Randolph Cliff, while also providing an impressive approach to his development. Learmonth was prepared to meet the cost himself, estimated at £18,556, but in 1828 the Cramond Road Trustees, responsible for public roads in the district, agreed to part-fund a new bridge on condition that it would be designed by Britain’s foremost bridge builder and be toll-free.

The contract was given to Aberdeen builder, John Gibb, with whom Telford had worked on the building of Aberdeen harbour. Work began in 1829 and was completed by the end of 1831. The stone was brought from Craigleith quarry near the village of Blackhall.The footway was carried on outer segmental arches, the wooden supports of which had to be carefully removed, slowly and evenly, to allow the finished bridge to settle uniformly into its final position. The resident engineer for the Works was Charles Atherton, who later acted as resident engineer on Telford's Broomielaw Bridge in Glasgow

The bridge was completed at the end of 1831. Between completion and the contract hand-over date, Gibb had a toll-gate erected at each end of the bridge and charged pedestrians one penny per head to enjoy the view from the structure. The opening date was early in 1832, though the bridge was not opened to horse and cart traffic until May 1834. The roadway was built to be 23 ft (7.0 m) wide, with footpaths 8 ft (2.4 m) wide on either side.

Learmonth died in 1858 before completion of most of his envisaged residential development. Owing to a sudden lull in building, Clarendon Crescent was not built until the 1850s, and Buckingham Terrace, Learmonth Terrace and Belgrave Crescent appeared only in the next decade.

In 1888, the Edinburgh Corporation asked the Burgh Engineer John Cooper to recommend measures designed to deter suicides which were occurring from the bridge. As a result, the height of the parapet was raised.

In 1957 the Institution of Civil Engineers, of which Telford was first President, installed a plaque on the east parapet to commemorate his bicentenary. This was subsequently stolen but replaced in 1982.

In June 1965, the Dean Bridge was listed as the highest importance category A.

In 2025, the City of Edinburgh Council launched a consultation on an expansion of the Edinburgh Trams network. One of two routes to connect Granton and the north of the city would involve running trams over the Dean Bridge. The existing carriageway is considered to be wide enough for two tram tracks, with sufficient depth below the road surface to accommodate a new concrete track slab. However, due to the limited width the bridge would need to be closed during construction. Six high-level options were considered to reinforce the bridge structure, along with building a new structure and considering an alternative route. The alternative route was suggested as the best option, that was a less risky option. Edinburgh World Heritage agree with the structural engineering concerns of Jacobs, and recommend the council prepare a detailed Heritage Impact Assessment.

The bridge is an important location in the novel "The Lewis Man" by Peter May.

== See also ==
- List of bridges in Scotland

== Bibliography ==
Paxton, Roland (1981). "Dean Bridge, Edinburgh". Our engineering heritage : three notable examples in the Edinburgh area : Dean Bridge, Leith Docks, Forth Rail Bridge. Edinburgh: Institution of Civil Engineers. Edinburgh and East of Scotland Association.

Jacobs (25 July 2025), Trams to Granton, BioQuarter and Beyond. Orchard Brae Corridor Dean Bridge Structures Report, The City of Edinburgh Council
