= Ekaterina Lermontova =

Russian paleontologist

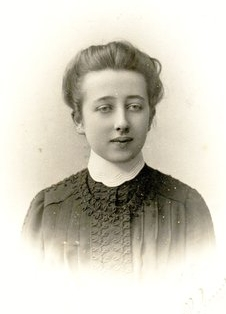
Ekaterina Lermontova

Ekaterina Vladimirovna Lermontova (11 February 1889 – 9 January 1942) was a Russian Empire and Soviet paleontologist responsible for creating the first Cambrian stratigraphy of Siberia. Species of fossil animals and algae, as well as Cambrian biostratigraphic divisions are named in her honor.

== Early life and education ==
Lermontova was born in St. Petersburg to a family including Mikhail Lermontov, a poet, and Iuliia Lermontova, a chemist. She was educated at the Women's Pedagogical Institute and graduated in 1910, then received a degree from the University of St. Petersburg in 1912.

== Career and research ==
In 1921, she was employed by the Geological Committee and the All-Union Scientific Research Institute of Geology. Lermontova's research focused on Cambrian fossils in Siberia; she was the first researcher to investigate Cambrian trilobites in the then-USSR. Her research included trilobite fossils in Kazakhstan, Siberia, the Ural Mountains, and Middle Asia. She was killed in the Siege of Leningrad during World War II.

== Legacy ==
Lermontova is the namesake of biostratigraphic divisions of the Cambrian and of fossil animals and algae from the Cambrian.
