= Water of Leith =

River in Edinburgh, Scotland

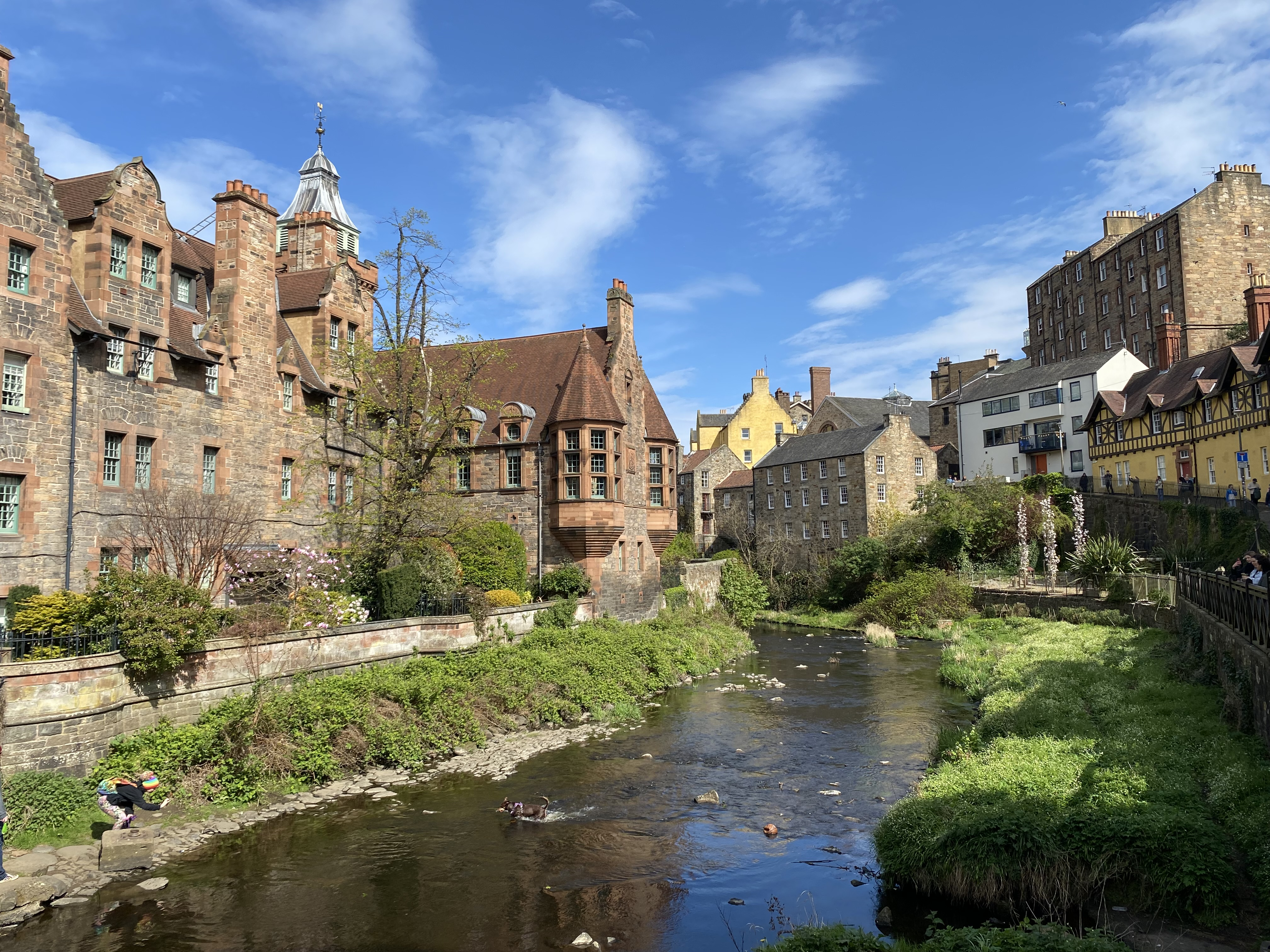

Location
- Sovereign state: United Kingdom
- Country: Scotland
- Council areas: West Lothian, Edinburgh

Physical characteristics
- Source
  - location: Millstone Rig, West Lothian
  - coordinates: 55°59′N 3°10′W
- Mouth
  - location: Leith Docks, Edinburgh
  - coordinates: 55.979399°N 3.170638°W
  - elevation: 0 m (0 ft)
- Length: 35 km (22 mi)

The Water of Leith (Scottish Gaelic: Uisge Lìte) is a river in Edinburgh, Scotland. It rises in the Pentland Hills before flowing through the centre of the city and emptying into the Firth of Forth at the Port of Leith.

== Name ==
The name Leith may be of Brittonic origin and derived from *lejth meaning "damp, moist" (Welsh llaith). It is less likely that the name derives from the Old Norse lodda meaning a river. The Gaelic form of the name is Lìte (Leith), with Uisge Lìte being the full translation of "Water of Leith".

The Dictionary of the Scots Language defines the term "water" here as "A large stream, usu. thought of as intermediate in size between a Burn and a river."

== Course ==
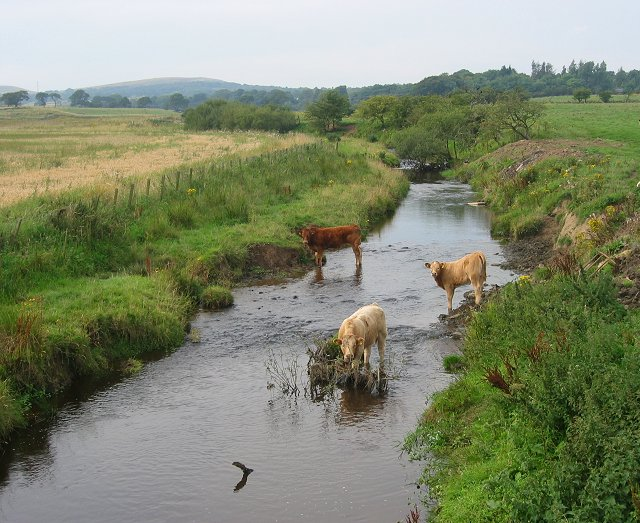
Upper reaches of the Water of Leith

The length of the main stream is 20 miles (31.7 km). Its source is the Colzium Springs in the Pentland Hills. The river travels through Harperrig Reservoir, past the ruins of Cairns Castle, on to Balerno, Currie, Juniper Green, Colinton, Slateford, Longstone, Saughton, Balgreen, Roseburn and West Coates. The river nears Edinburgh city centre between West End and Dean Village; the site of old watermills in a deep gorge. The ravine is dramatically spanned by the Dean Bridge, designed by Thomas Telford and built in 1832 for the road to Queensferry.

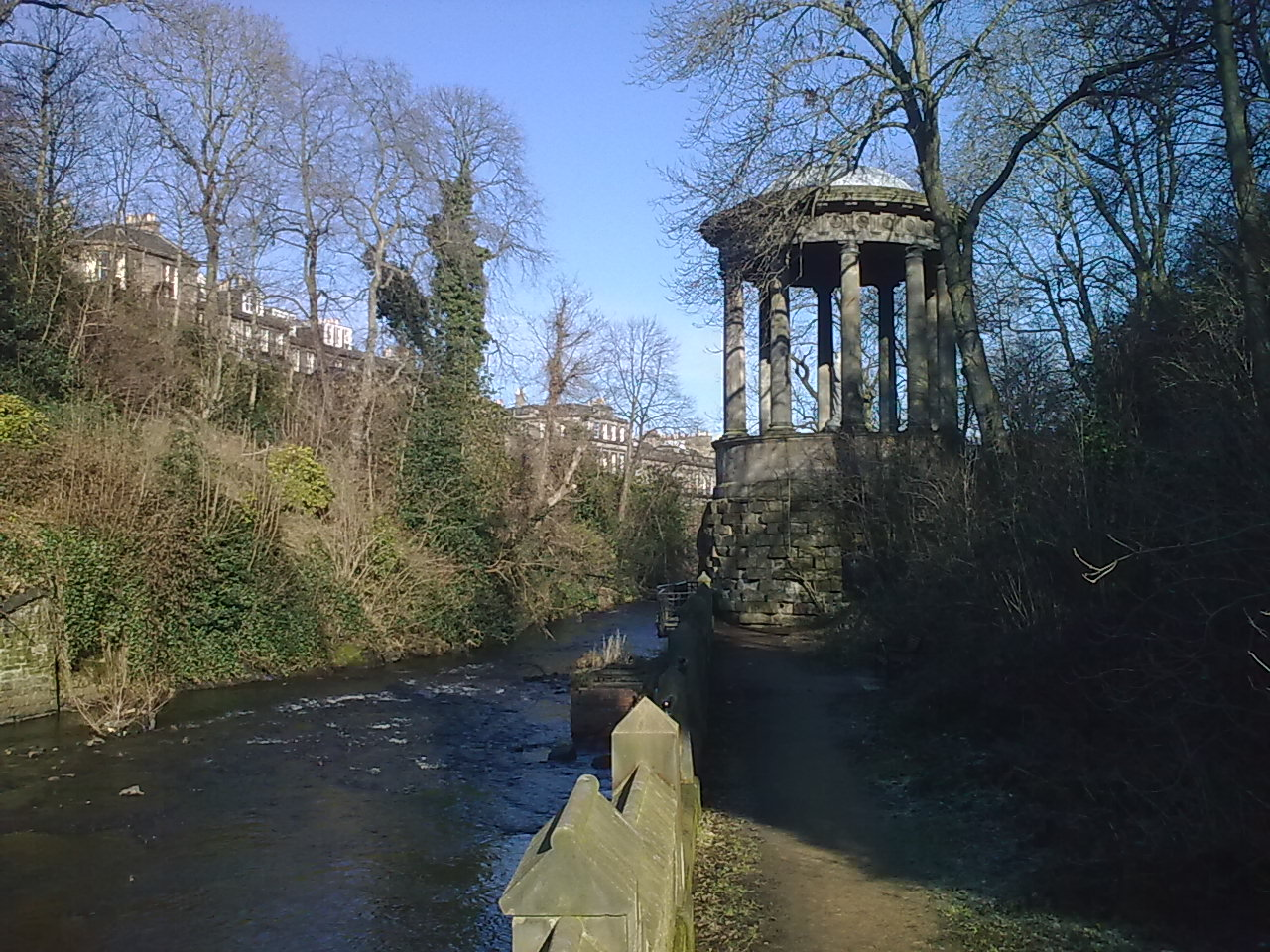
St Bernard's Well sits alongside the Water of Leith in the Stockbridge area, with Comely Bank opposite

The river flows on past Stockbridge, Inverleith, Canonmills and Warriston where it passes through shallows at a place known as Puddocky which is commonly thought to refer to "puddocks", the Scots language term for frogs, but actually took its name from the former Paddock Hall sited nearby. The river continues past Bonnington, the site of another watermill, to Leith where it widens into the old harbour and Port of Leith at the Shore. Leith Docks have been extended considerably out into the firth from the old shoreline.

== Water of Leith Walkway ==
The Water of Leith Walkway is beside the river for 12.8 miles (20.6 km) from Balerno to Leith. The route forms an attractive haven for wildlife, passing through areas of woodland, often well separated from roads. For some distance the walkway follows the route of former railway tracks, and the remains of tunnels, bridges and other features of more than one railway may be seen at many places along the route. In Colinton the route passes through a 140-metre (460 ft) tunnel with a noted mural, a central theme of which is the poem From a railway carriage by Robert Louis Stevenson.

== Water of Leith Conservation Trust ==
The Water of Leith Conservation Trust, founded in 1988, is a registered charity whose objective is to "conserve the Water of Leith and its environs" and "promote the natural and built heritage of the river". The Trust runs educational programmes and operates a visitor centre close to where the Union Canal passes over the Water of Leith via the Slateford Aqueduct in south-west Edinburgh.

== Wildlife ==
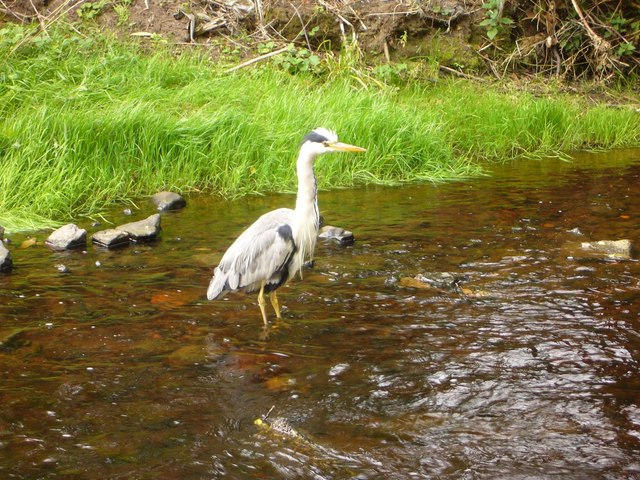
Heron on the Water of Leith

The river contains 15 different types of fish including brown trout, wild grayling, eels, stone loach, minnow, three-spined stickleback and flounder. A few sea-trout run the river, and occasional Atlantic salmon are reported, although those from which scale samples have been obtained have turned out to be from other catchments.

Until the weirs are either demolished or furnished with effective fish-passes, there is little chance of a population of salmon establishing themselves in this river again. Roe deer, badgers, otters and other mammals are often seen. The river and its environs are the haunt of a wide variety of woodland and water birds, including kingfisher, grey heron, pied wagtail, great spotted woodpecker and white-throated dipper.

== See also ==
- Rivers of Scotland
- River Almond, which flows through Cramond and Kirkliston
- River Esk, Lothian
- Water of Leith, a river which flows through Dunedin, New Zealand
