= Robert Scott Lauder =

Scottish painter (1803–1869)

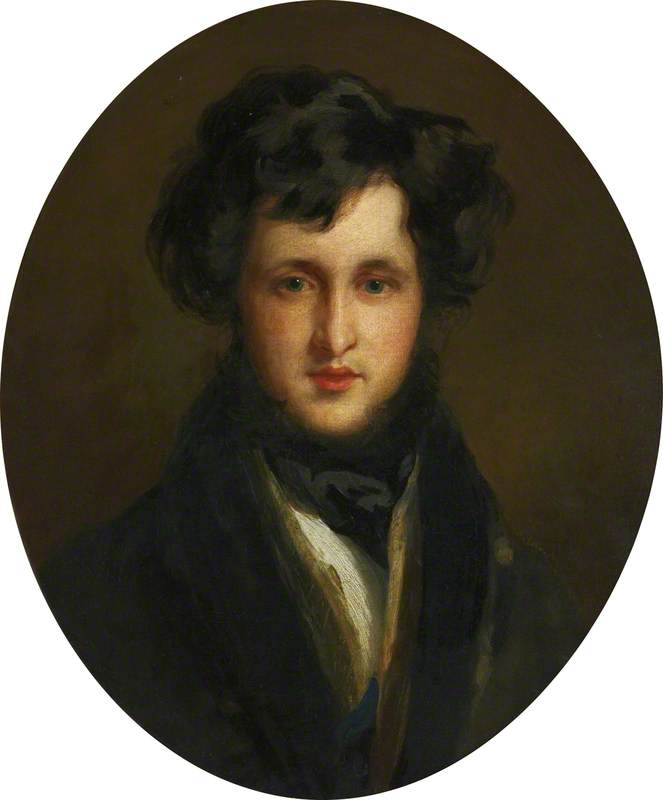
- Born: 25 June 1803
- Died: 21 April 1869 (aged 65)
- Spouse: Isabella Thomson
- Relatives: James Eckford Lauder (brother)

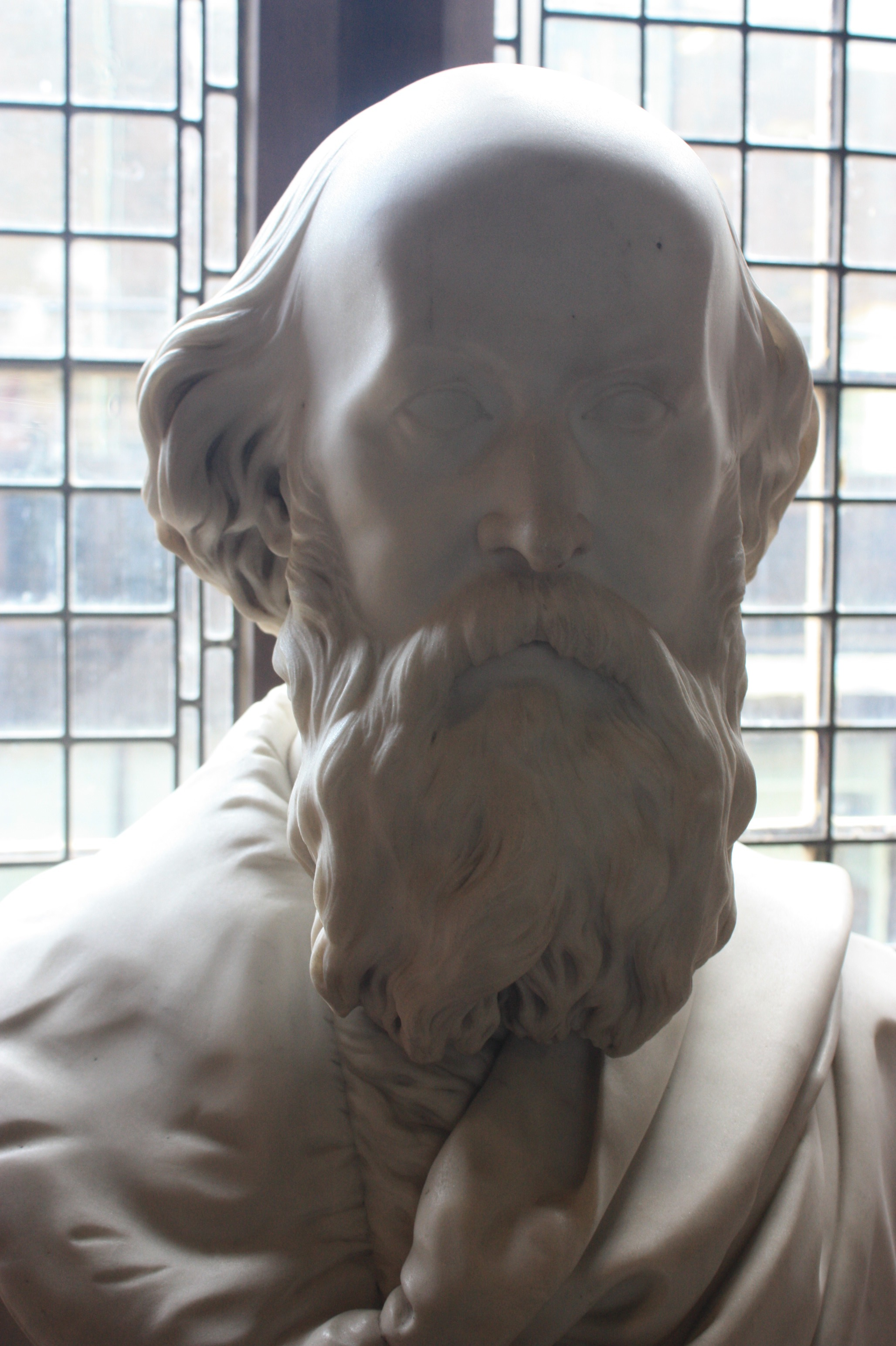
Robert Scott Lauder by John Hutchison, 1861

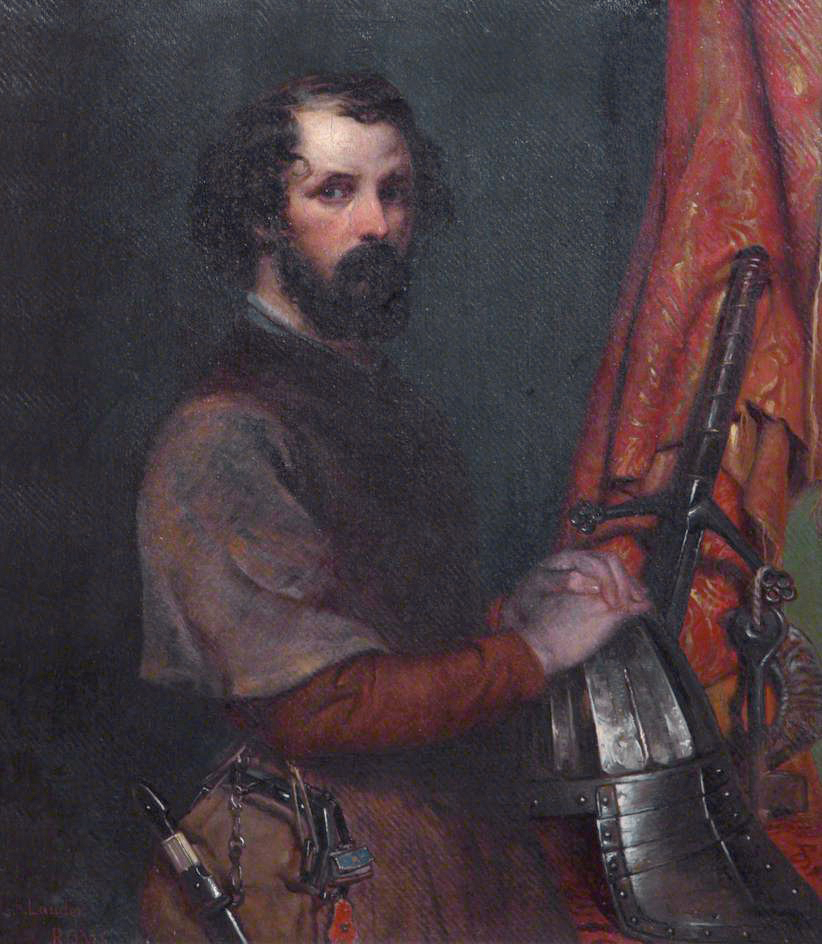
Self-portrait in 17th-century costume

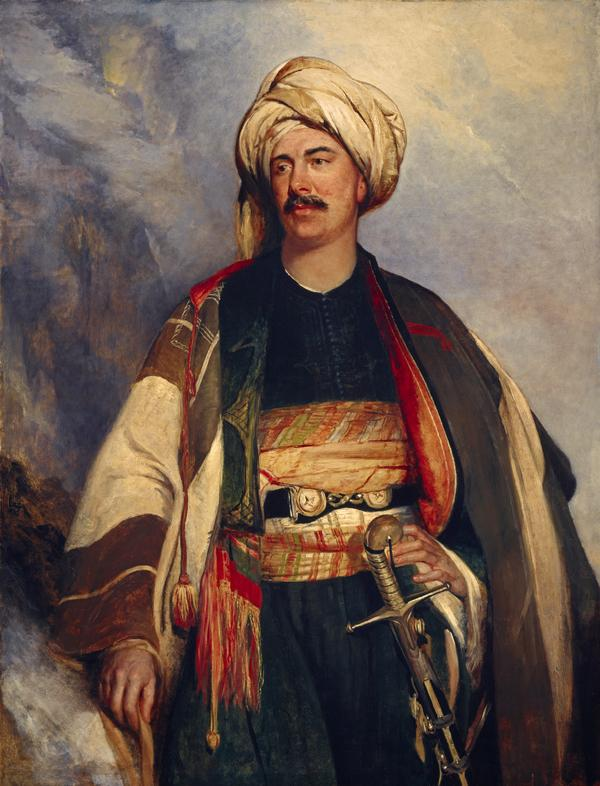
Portrait of David Roberts, 1840

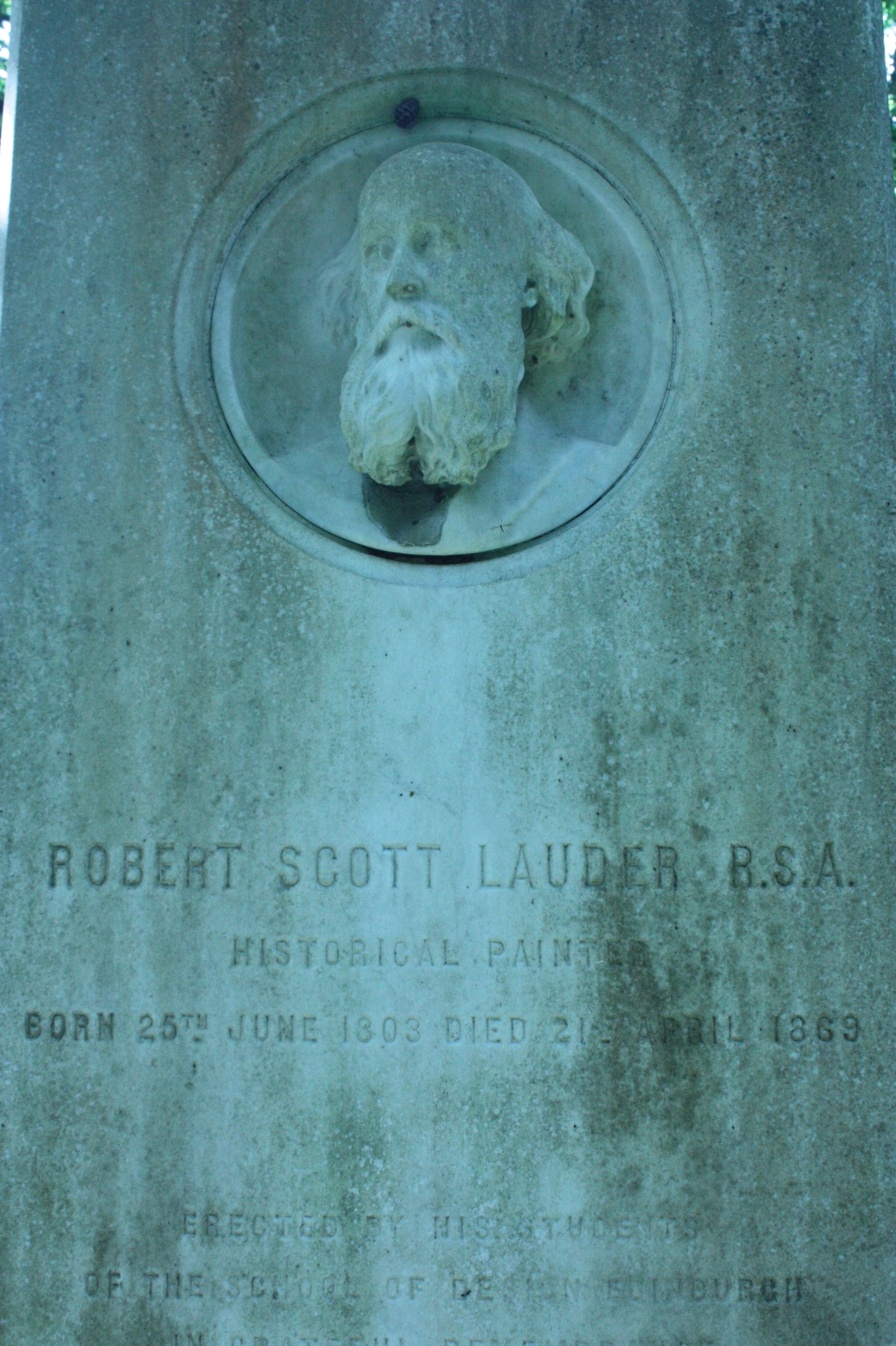
Robert Scott Lauder's grave, Warriston Cemetery

Robert Scott Lauder RSA (25 June 1803 – 21 April 1869) was a Scottish artist who described himself as a "historical painter". He was one of the original members of the Royal Scottish Academy.

== Life and work ==
Lauder was born at Silvermills, Edinburgh, the third son of Helen Tait (d.1850) and John Lauder of Silvermills (d. 1838), Burgess of Edinburgh and proprietor of the tannery at Silvermills. After attending the Royal High School, he went to London, where his eldest brother William was engaged in the family business.

He returned to Edinburgh in about 1826 and was elected one of the original members of the Royal Scottish Academy in 1830. At this point Lauder was living with his brother William Lauder at 24 Fettes Row in Edinburgh's New Town. On 9 September 1833 at St Cuthbert's Church in Edinburgh, he married Isabella Ramsay Thomson and they then went abroad, accompanied by his younger artist-brother, James Eckford Lauder. Robert studied for some years in Rome, Florence, Bologna, Venice and Munich.

Lauder returned to London in 1838 where he lived for several years, where his three children — Isabella, John, and Robert — were baptised at St. Thomas’s Church, Southwark, in 1840, 1841, and 1844 respectively. Whilst in London he exhibited at the Royal Academy and competed in the Westminster Hall competition of 1847, sending his Christ walking on the Sea, which was subsequently purchased by Lady Angela Burdett-Coutts, 1st Baroness Burdett-Coutts. He became the first president of the short-lived National Institution of Fine Arts and also exhibited there.

He later removed back to Edinburgh in 1849 where both his sons — Robert Scott Lauder (born 1844), who became a physician, and John Thomson Lauder (1841–1865) — attended the Edinburgh Academy. Sir Walter Scott's novels provided him with subjects for many of his most successful historical paintings. About 1860, he suffered a paralytic stroke and did not practice after 1861. He died at Edinburgh from a bout of bronchitis on 21 April 1869, still paralysed.

He is buried in Warriston Cemetery in Edinburgh, beneath a large pale sandstone stone with white Sicilian marble inset, carved by John Hutchison. It stands to the east side of the westmost path, just south of Horatio McCulloch's grave, but is hard to spot as the sculpture and main monument faces away from the path into the undergrowth. His name is however listed at the head of the reverse side (facing the path) above that of his younger brother, James Eckford Lauder who is buried with him.

== Selected paintings ==
Key works:

- Scene from The Bride of Lammermoor (1839)
- The Trial of Effie Deans (1840)
- Meg Merrilies (1842)
- Hannah presenting Samuel to Eli (1845)
- Christ Teaches Humility (1845)
- Mother and Child (1848)
- Sentinels
- John Gibson Lockhart (Portrait)
- Reverend John Thomson of Duddingstone (Portrait)
- William Simson, R.S.A. (Portrait)
- Hagar & Ishmael (1840)

Other pictures of note are:

- Italian Goatherds entertaining a brother of the Santissima Trinita (1843)
- Ruth "so she gleaned in the field until even" (1845) (see Book of Ruth)
- The Gow Chrom Reluctantly Conducting the Glee Maiden to a Place of Safety (1846)
- Christ and the Woman Taken in Adultery

Other portraits of note are:

- Sir Archibald Alison, Bt.
- Thomas Duncan
- John Henning Sr.
- Elizabeth Lauder, Mrs. William Paterson, with her daughter Janet
- Henry Lauder (the artist's brother) painted c. 1825–1827.
- Sir Thomas Dick Lauder
- Robert Scott Lauder (self)
- John Gibson Lockhart, with Charlotte Scott
- David Roberts (1840)
- David Scott
- Sir John Steell
- Thomas Thomson

== Family ==
In 1833 he married Isabella Thomson (1809–1869) daughter of Rev John Thomson of Duddingston.

== Notes ==
- Bryan's Dictionary of Painters and Engravers, edited by George C. Williamson, London 1927, (5 volumes).
- The Edinburgh Academy Register, Edinburgh, 1914.
- Testaments of John Lauder of Silvermills & Helen Tait, in the National Archives of Scotland.
- Lee, Sidney, ed. (1892). "Lauder, Robert Scott" . Dictionary of National Biography. Vol. 32. London: Smith, Elder & Co.
