= New Town, Edinburgh =

Central area of Edinburgh, Scotland

UNESCO World Heritage Site
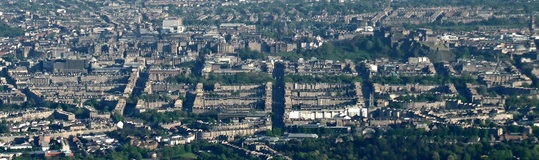
- New Town, seen looking south from the air

- Location within the City of Edinburgh council area Location within Scotland Location within the United Kingdom
- Location: Edinburgh, Scotland
- Part of: Old and New Towns of Edinburgh
- Criteria: Cultural: (ii)(iv)
- Reference: 728
- Inscription: 1995 (19th Session)
- New Town, Edinburgh (Edinburgh)

The New Town is a central area of Edinburgh, the capital of Scotland. It was built in stages between 1767 and around 1850, and retains much of its original neo-classical and Georgian architecture. Its best-known street is Princes Street, facing Edinburgh Castle and the Old Town across the geological depression of the former Nor Loch. The area's New Town Gardens received a heritage designation in 2001. The combined New Town, Old Town, and West End were designated a UNESCO World Heritage Site in 1995.

== Proposal and planning ==
The idea of a New Town was first suggested in the late 17th century when the Duke of Albany and York (later King James VII and II), when resident Royal Commissioner at Holyrood Palace, encouraged the idea of having an extended regality to the north of the city and a North Bridge. He gave the city a grant:

That, when they should have occasion to enlarge their city by purchasing ground without the town, or to build bridges or arches for the accomplishing of the same, not only were the proprietors of such lands obliged to part with the same on reasonable terms, but when in possession thereof, they are to be erected into a regality in favour of the citizens.

It is possible that, with such patronage, the New Town might have been built many years earlier than it was but, in 1682, the Duke left the city and became King in 1685, only to lose the throne in 1688.

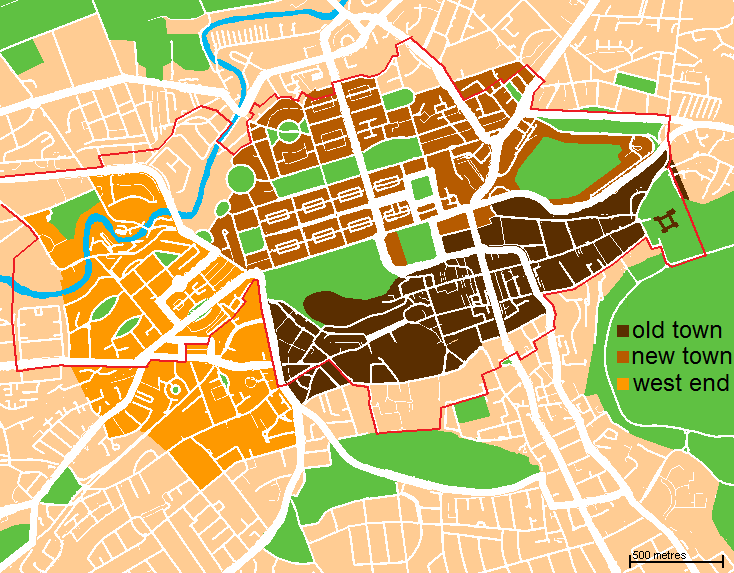
Map of the city, showing the New Town (mid brown), the Old Town, and the West End, with the World Heritage Site indicated by the red line.

The decision to construct a New Town was taken by the city fathers, after overcrowding inside the walls of the Old Town reached breaking point and to prevent an exodus of wealthy citizens from the city to London. The Age of Enlightenment had arrived in Edinburgh, and the outdated city fabric did not suit the professional and merchant classes who lived there. Lord Provost George Drummond succeeded in extending the boundary of the royal burgh to encompass the fields to the north of the Nor Loch, the heavily polluted body of water which occupied the valley immediately north of the city. A scheme to drain the Loch was put into action, although the process was not fully completed until 1817. Crossing points were built to access the new land; the North Bridge in 1772, and the Earthen Mound, which began as a tip for material excavated during construction of the New Town. The Mound, as it is known today, reached its present proportions in the 1830s.

As the successive stages of the New Town were developed, the more affluent middle and upper classes left the Old Town and moved northwards from cramped tenements in narrow closes into new grand Georgian homes on wide roads. However, the working classes and poor remained in the Old Town.

== The First New Town ==
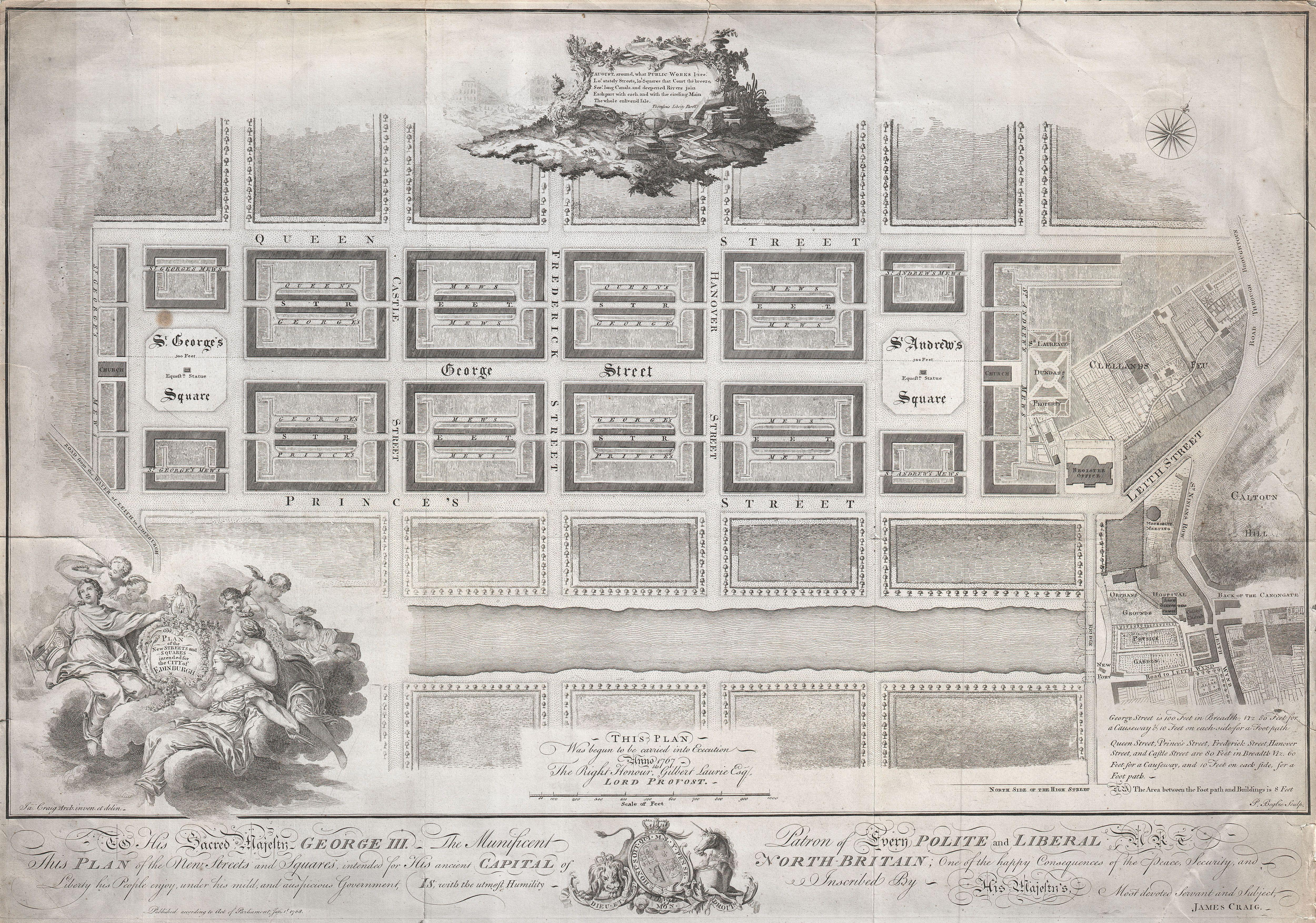
Plan for the New Town by James Craig (1768)

A design competition was held in January 1766 to find a suitably modern layout for the new suburb. It was won by 26-year-old James Craig, who, following the natural contours of the land, proposed a simple axial grid, with a principal thoroughfare along the ridge linking two garden squares. Two other main roads were located downhill to the north and south with two minor streets between. Several mews off the minor streets provided stable lanes for the large homes. Completing the grid are three north-south cross streets.

Craig's original plan has not survived but it has been suggested that it is indicated on a map published by John Laurie in 1766. This map shows a diagonal layout with a central square reflecting a new era of civic Hanoverian British patriotism by echoing the design of the Union Flag. Both Princes Street and Queen Street are shown as double sided. A simpler revised design reflected the same spirit in the names of its streets and civic spaces.

=== Street names ===
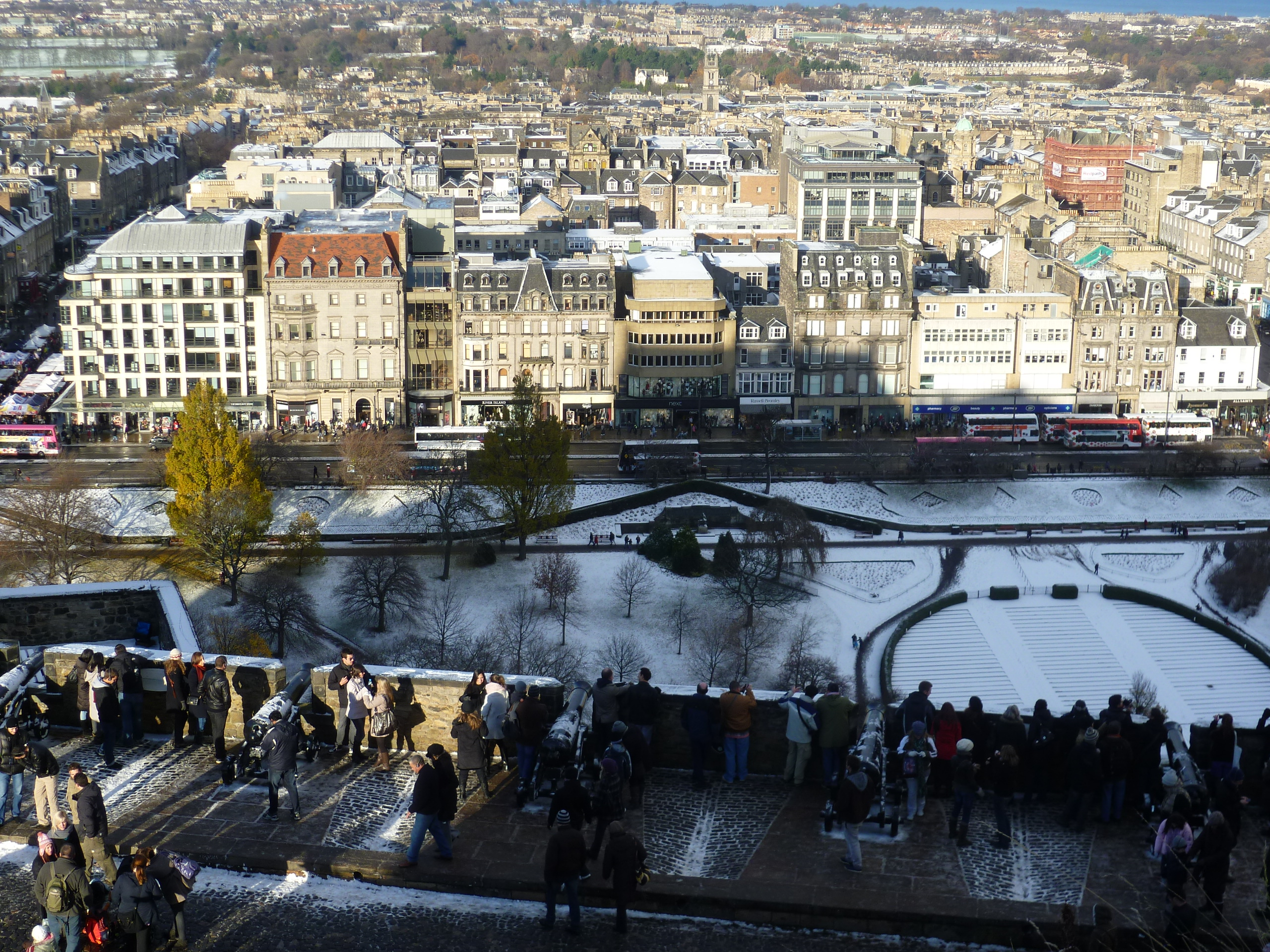
View of the First New Town from Edinburgh Castle, largely obscured by modern shopping developments

The intended principal street was named George Street, after the king at the time, George III. Queen Street was to be located to the north, named after his wife, and St. Giles Street to the south, after the city's patron saint. St Andrew Square and St. George's Square were the names chosen to represent the union of Scotland and England. The idea was continued with the smaller Thistle Street (for Scotland's national emblem) between George Street and Queen Street, and Rose Street (for England's emblem) between George Street and Princes Street.

King George rejected the name St. Giles Street, St Giles being the patron saint of lepers and also the name of a slum area or 'rookery' on the edge of what is now the West End of London. It was therefore renamed Princes Street after his eldest son, the Prince of Wales (the future George IV). The name of St. George's Square was changed to Charlotte Square, after the Queen, to avoid confusion with the existing George Square on the South Side of the Old Town. The westernmost blocks of Thistle Street were renamed Hill Street and Young Street, making Thistle Street half the length of Rose Street. The three streets completing the grid, Castle, Frederick and Hanover Streets, were named for the view of the castle, King George's second son Prince Frederick, and the House of Hanover respectively.

=== Development ===
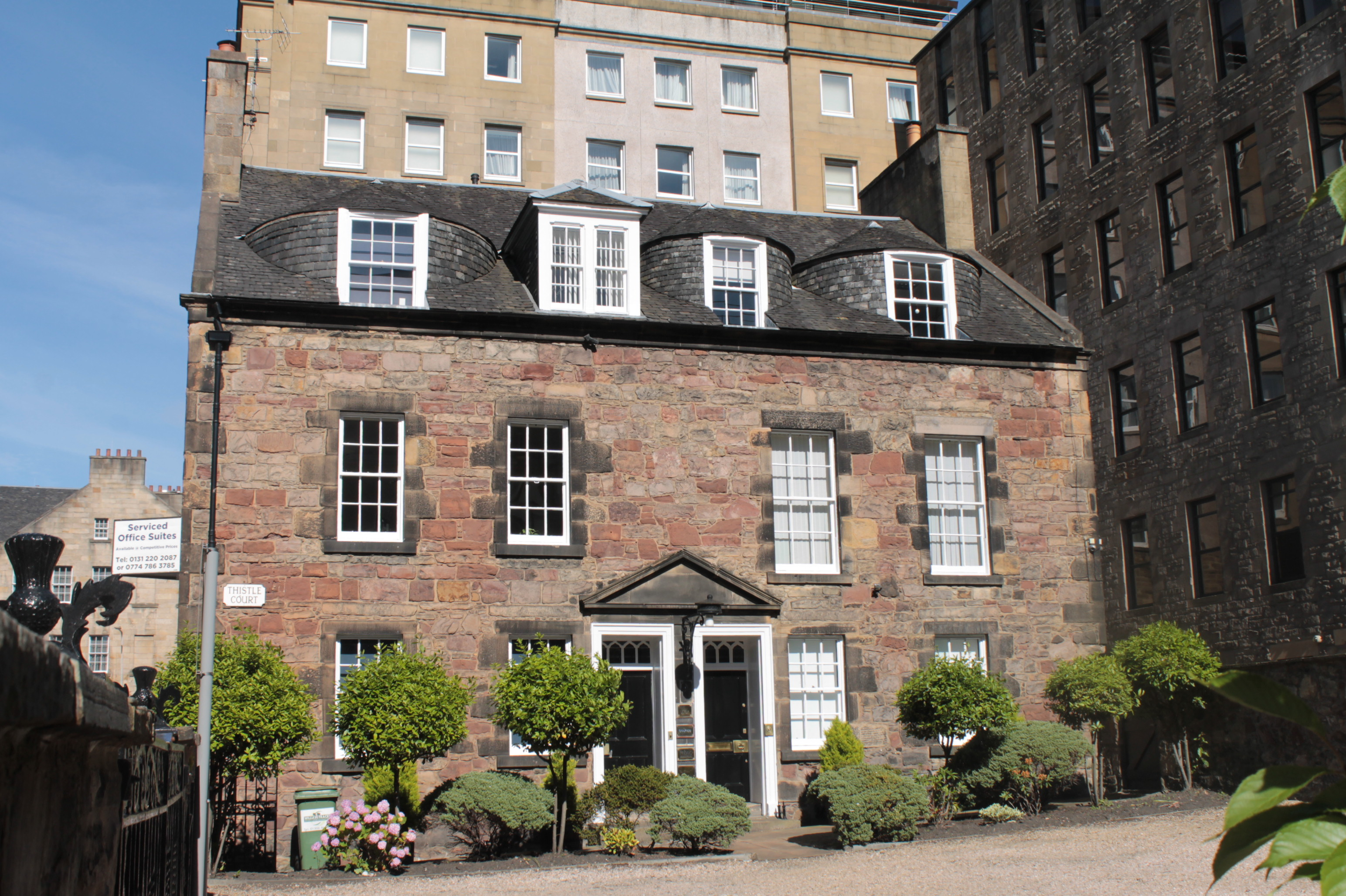
Thistle Court, the first building in the New Town

Craig's proposals hit further problems when development began. Initially the exposed new site was unpopular, leading to a £20 premium being offered to the first builder on site. This was received by John Young who built Thistle Court, the oldest remaining buildings in the New Town, at the east end of Thistle Street in 1767. Instead of building as a terrace as envisaged, he built a small courtyard. Doubts were overcome soon enough, and further construction started in the east with St. Andrew Square.

Craig had intended that the view along George Street be terminated by two large churches, situated at the outer edge of each square, on axis with George Street. Whilst the western church on Charlotte Square was built, at St Andrew Square the land behind the proposed church site was owned by Sir Lawrence Dundas. He decided to build a town mansion here and commissioned a design from Sir William Chambers. The resulting Palladian mansion, known as Dundas House, was completed in 1774. In 1825 it was acquired by the Royal Bank of Scotland and today is the registered office of the bank. The forecourt of the building, with the equestrian monument to John Hope, 4th Earl of Hopetoun, occupies the proposed church site. St. Andrew's Church had to be built on a site on George Street. The lack of a visual termination at the end of this street was remedied in 1823 with William Burn's monument to Henry Dundas.

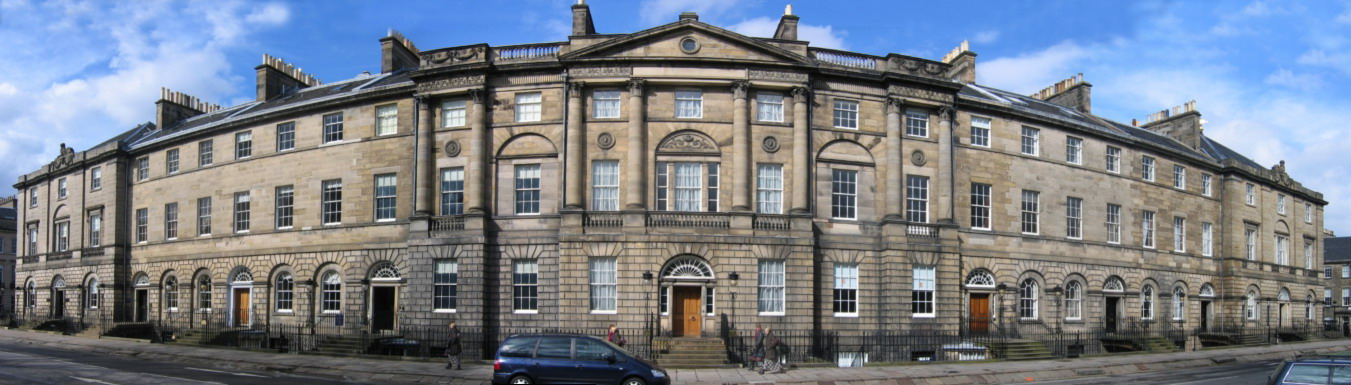
Montage image of Robert Adam's north side of Charlotte Square. Bute House, official residence of the First Minister of Scotland, is in the centre.

The first New Town was mainly completed by 1820, with the completion of Charlotte Square. This was built to a design by Robert Adam, and was the only architecturally unified section of the New Town. Adam also produced a design for St. George's Church, although his design was superseded by that of Robert Reid. The building, now known as West Register House, now houses part of the National Archives of Scotland. The north side of Charlotte Square features Bute House, formerly the official residence of the Secretary of State for Scotland and, since the introduction of devolution in Scotland, the official residence of the First Minister of Scotland.

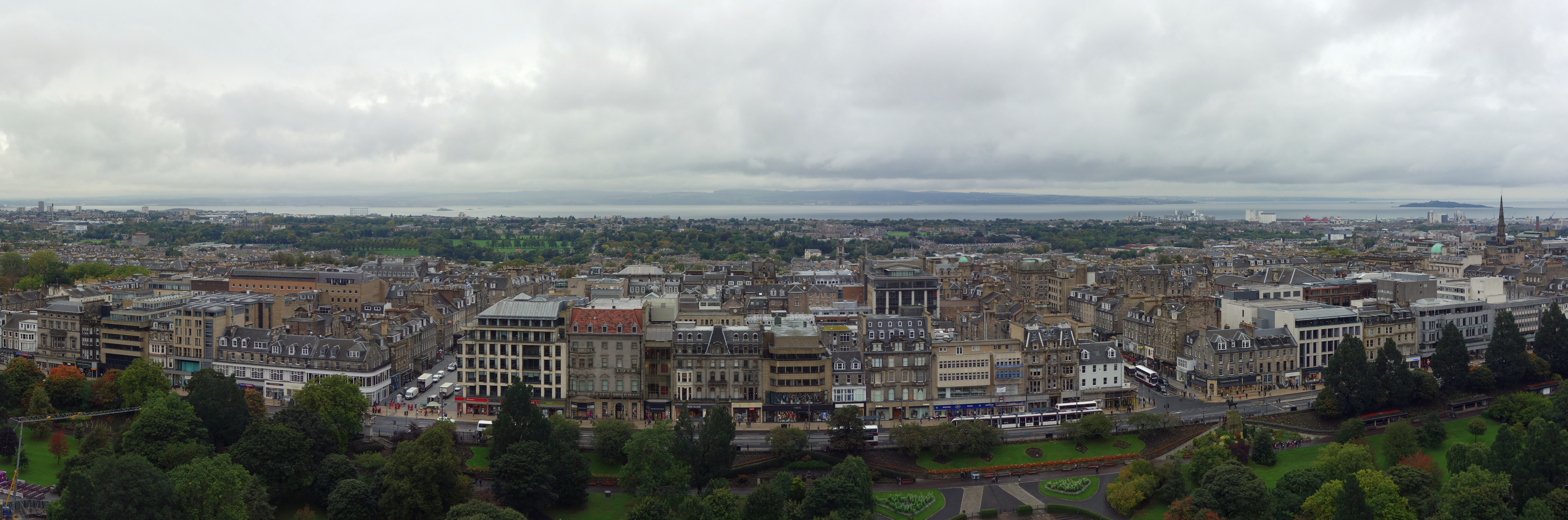
Edinburgh's New Town, viewed from Edinburgh Castle. Princes Street and the Princes Street Gardens are visible in the foreground.

A few small sections remained undeveloped at the time. In 1885 an unbuilt section of Queen Street (an open garden until that time), north of St Andrew Square, provided the site for the Scottish National Portrait Gallery. To the north-west, north of Charlotte Square, the land was part of the Earl of Moray's estate and a long-running boundary dispute with the Moray Estate caused delay in development. A section of Glenfinlas Street at the north-west corner of Charlotte Square was not completed until 1990 while the western end of Queen Street, north of Charlotte Square, has never been developed.

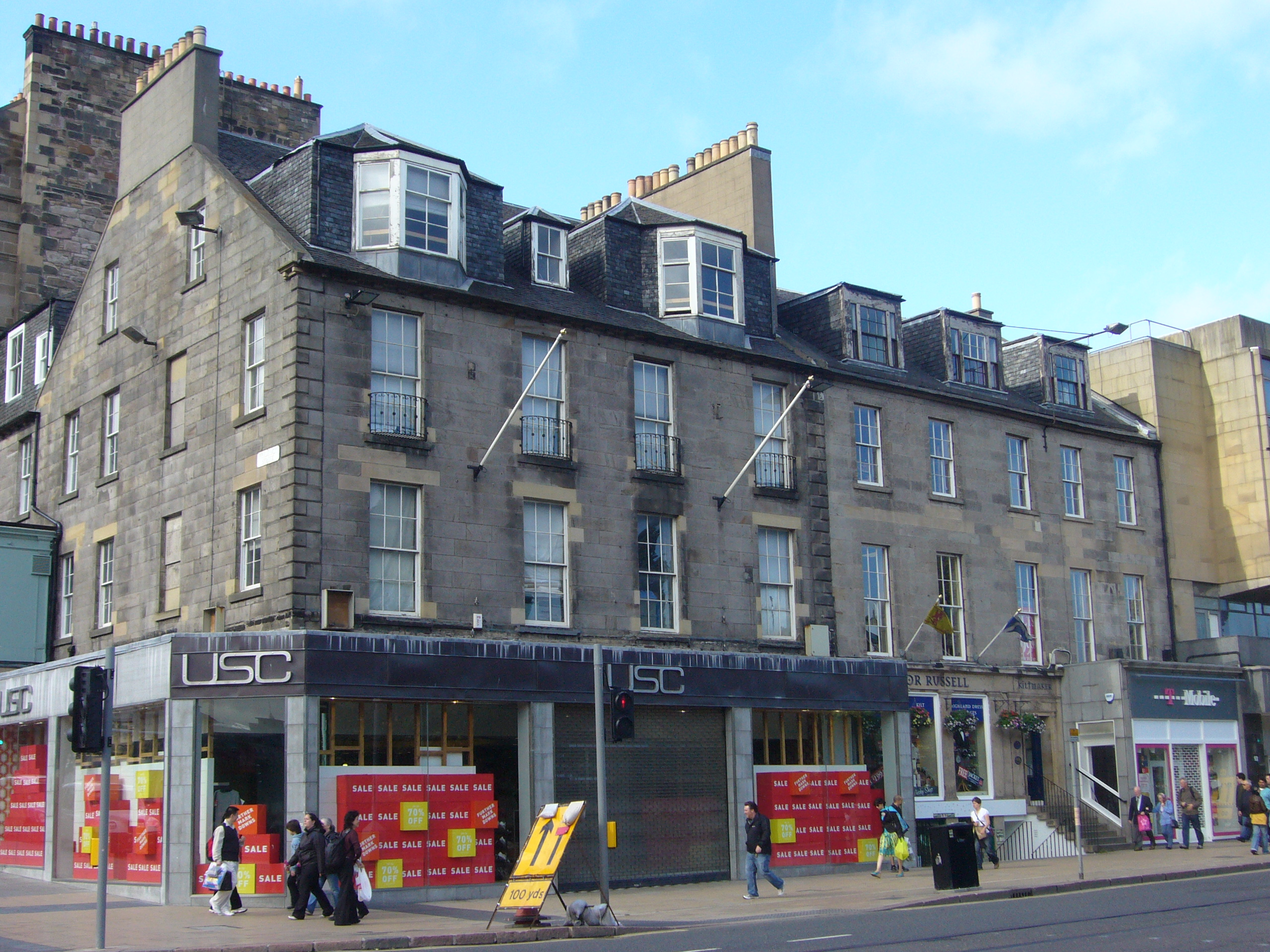
Surviving Georgian buildings in Princes Street

The New Town was envisaged as a mainly residential suburb with a number of professional offices of domestic layout. It had few planned retail ground floors, however it did not take long for the commercial potential of the site to be realised. Shops were soon opened on Princes Street, and during the 19th century the majority of the townhouses on that street were replaced with larger commercial buildings. Occasional piecemeal redevelopment continues to this day, though most of Queen Street and Thistle Street, and large sections of George Street, Hanover, Frederick and Castle Streets, are still lined with their original late 18th century buildings.

Many of the residents of the New Town were wealthy Scottish people (such as James Lindsay, 24th Earl of Crawford and Henry Dundas, 1st Viscount Melville) who were financially involved in slavery in the American colonies, either through involvement in slave-trading or the ownership of slave plantations. Jamaican-born historian Sir Geoff Palmer stated that "Our glorious New Town, seen by many as the physical embodiment of the Scottish Enlightenment, was, sadly, partly funded by the enormous profits derived from the enslavement of Africans."

== Northern, or Second, New Town and extensions ==
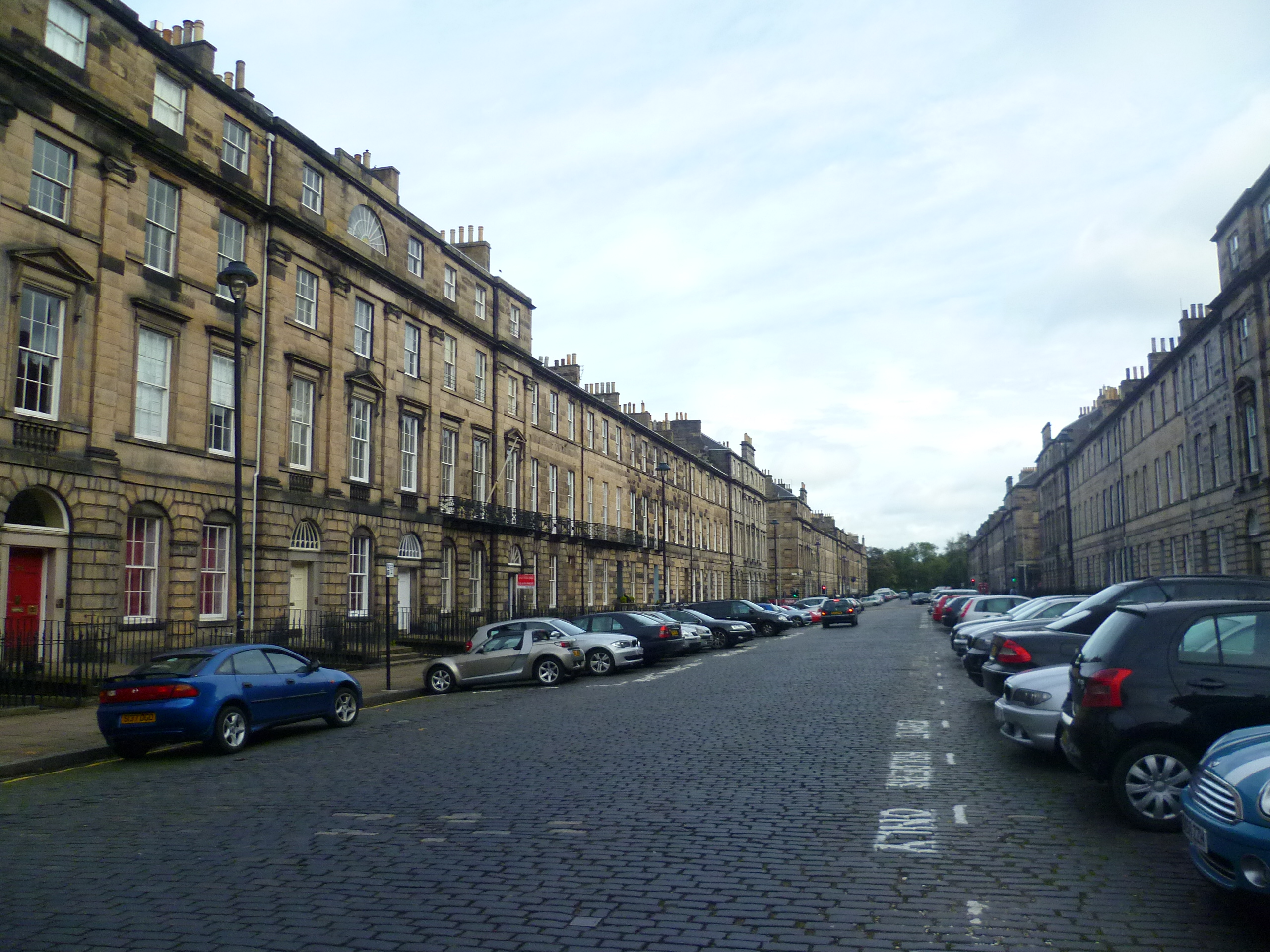
Great King Street. Part of the northern extension to the original New Town

After 1800, the success of the first New Town led to grander schemes. The 'Northern New Town' (now usually called the Second New Town) aimed to extend Edinburgh from the north of Queen Street Gardens towards the Water of Leith, with extensions to the east and west. These developments took place mostly between 1800–1830. Initial designs by William Sibbald followed the original grid orientation of Craig’s First New Town, with entire streets being built as one construction. Building continued on an extended Hanover Street, called Dundas Street and, beyond Great King Street, Pitt Street (later renamed to Dundas Street in the 1960s), almost 1 km north towards the Water of Leith at Canonmills, where Bellevue Crescent would eventually mark the most northern extent of the New Town project. Streets were laid out either side with Great King Street the central avenue terminated by Drummond Place to the east and Royal Circus to the west. Northumberland Street and Cumberland Street were lesser streets to the south and north respectively. Heriot Row and Abercromby Place, both one-sided streets at the southern limit of the development, enjoyed open aspects to Queen Street Gardens. The builder for large sections of the Second New Town was George Winton.

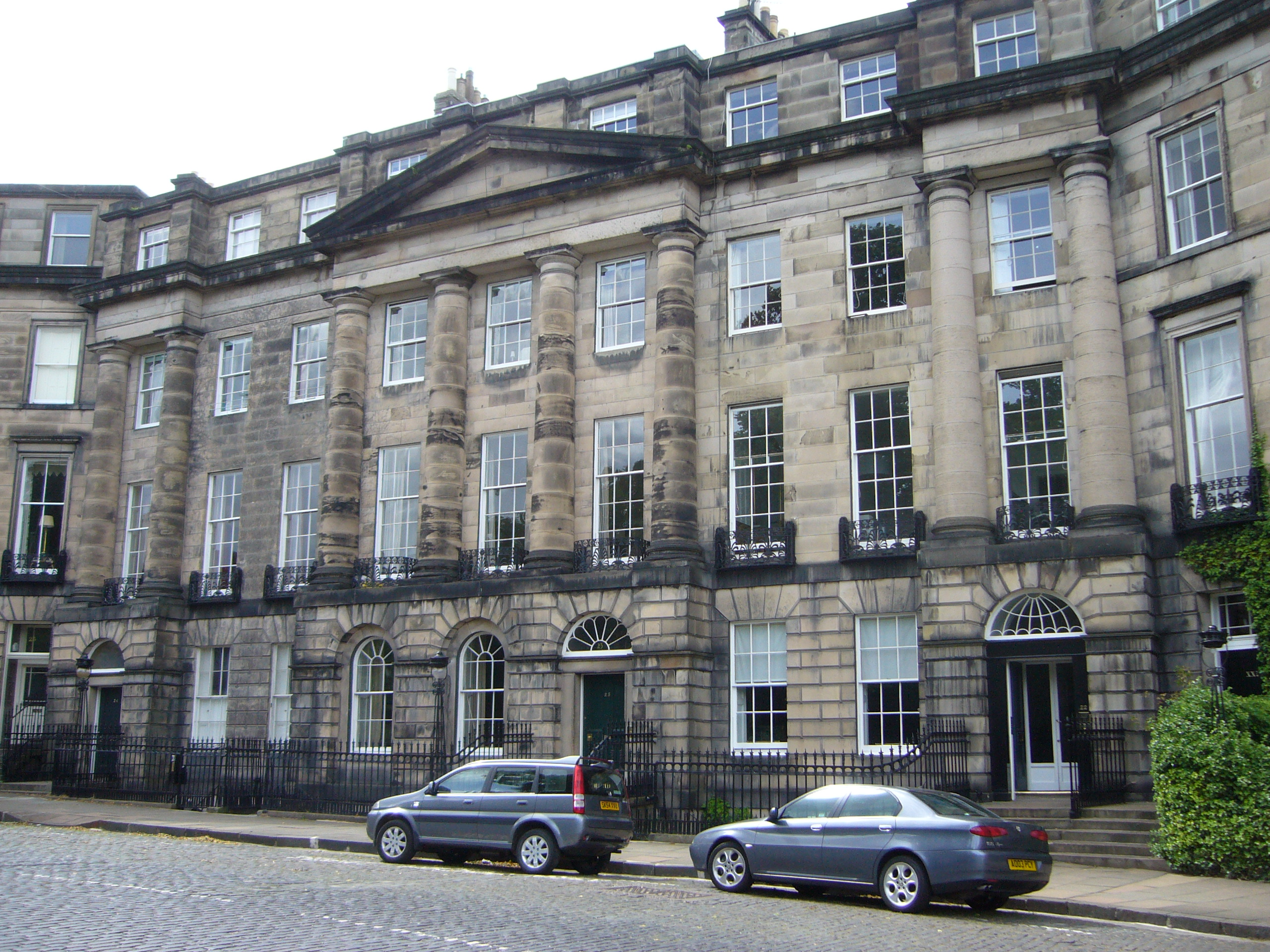
Moray Place. Part of the western extension to the original New Town

Very large sections of the Second New Town, built from the early 19th century are also still exactly as built. Townhouses generally occupied the east-west streets, with blocks of flats (called tenements in Scotland) along the north-south streets. Shops were originally generally restricted to the lower floors of the wider north-south streets. The larger houses had service mews running behind and parallel to their terraces.

The Picardy Place extension (including Broughton Street, Union Street and East London Street) was mostly finished by 1809. To the west of the original New Town, Shandwick Place, an extension of Princes Street, was started in 1805. Development of Melville Street and the area north of Shandwick Place followed in 1825. The Gayfield Estate (Gayfield Square) extension was designed in 1807 and from around 1813 the New Town gradually replaced and developed the older village of Stockbridge. The painter Henry Raeburn bought the Deanhough estate in the northwest of the New Town and started development in 1813 with Ann Street named after his wife.

In 1822, the Earl of Moray had plans drawn up by James Gillespie Graham to develop his Drumsheugh estate, between Charlotte Square and the Water of Leith. This was popular amongst the Scots nobility and wealthy lawyers. The bulk of the estate was complete by 1835, but many of the corner blocks were not finally added until the 1850s. The estate is now usually called the Moray Estate. It remains one of the city's most affluent areas and of the most exclusive set of addresses. Gillespie Graham continued the Westward expansion of the New Town here into the estate of Lord Alva, forming the West End Village.

== Eastern, or Third, New Town ==
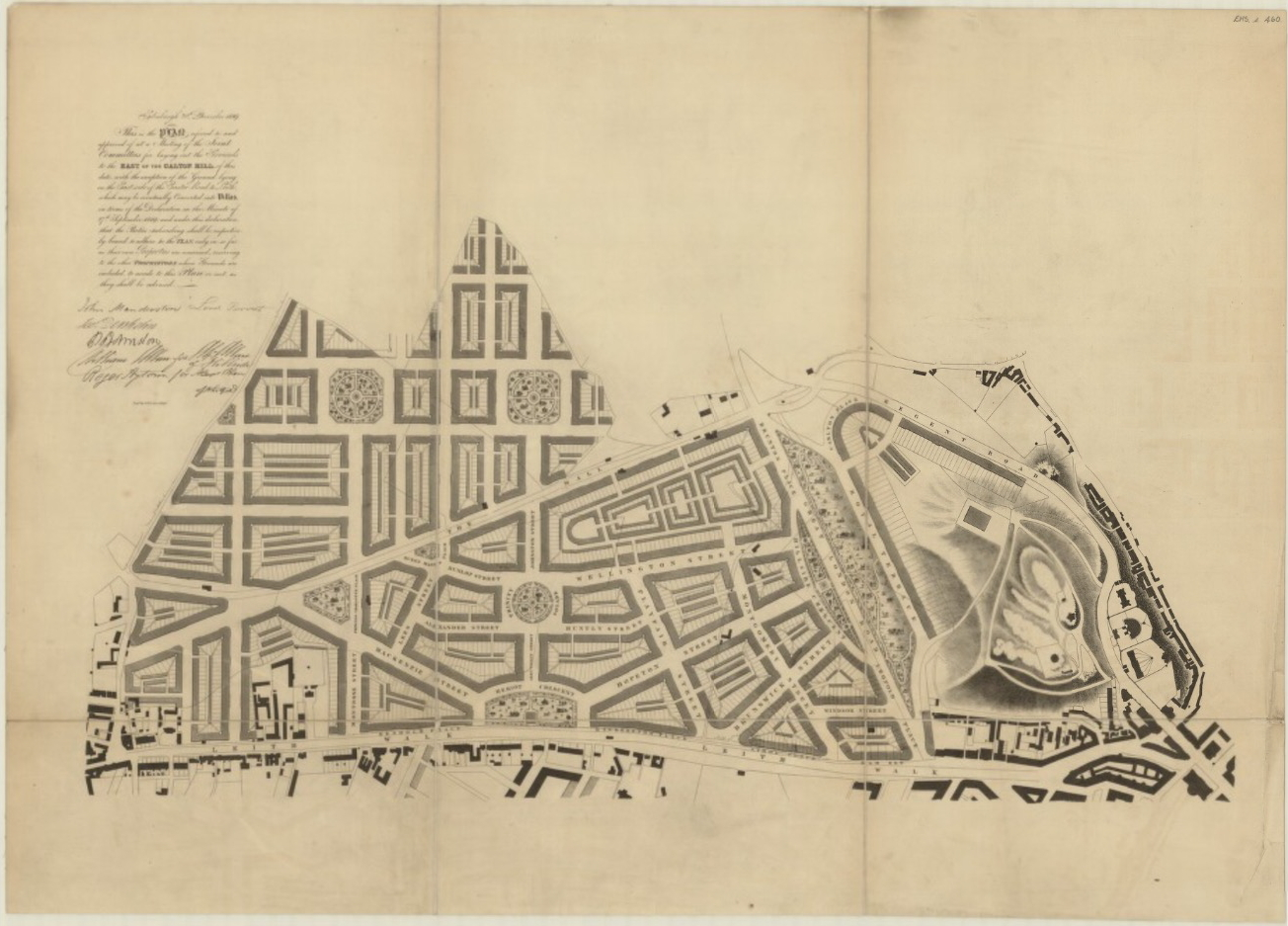
William Henry Playfair's plan for Edinburgh's Eastern New Town approved at a meeting on 27 September 1819, engraving by Wiliiam Home Lizars. Note that the orientation of the plan is with north on the left side, so Calton Hill is on the right.

In order to extend the New Town eastwards, the Lord Provost, Sir John Marjoribanks, succeeded in getting the elegant Regent Bridge built. It was completed in 1819. The bridge spanned a deep ravine with narrow inconvenient streets and made access to Calton Hill much easier and agreeable from Princes Street.

Even before the bridge had been built, Edinburgh Town Council were making preparations for building the Eastern New Town, which would stretch from the slopes of Calton Hill, north to Leith, between Leith Walk and Easter Road. The Lord Provost made an agreement with the main landowners in 1811, some initial surveying was done and there was a competition for architectural plans for the development that on 1 January 1813, the results of which were inconclusive. A number of prominent architects were then asked for their opinions: William Stark, James Gillespie, Robert Burn and his son William Burn, John Paterson and Robert Reid and others.

Stark's observations were particularly valued and he went on to expand them in a "Report to the Lord Provost, Magistrates and Council of Edinburgh on the Plans for Laying out the Grounds for Buildings between Edinburgh and Leith". Stark died on 9 October 1813, and his report was published posthumously in 1814.

The commissioners decided to turn to Stark's pupil William Henry Playfair. He was appointed in February 1818, and produced a plan in April 1819, that closely followed Starks's recommendations. Playfair’s designs were intended to create a New Town even more magnificent than Craig's.

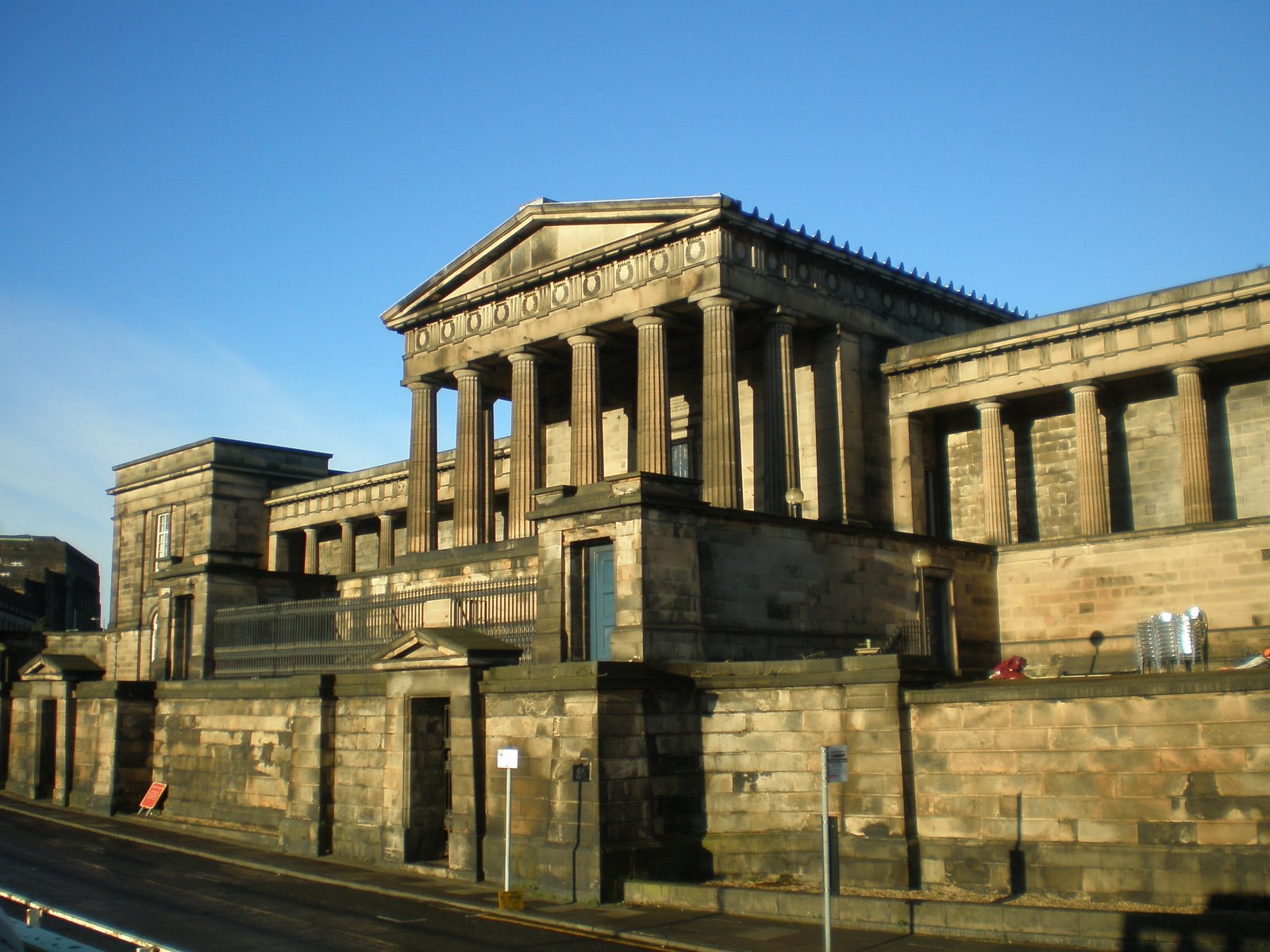
The Old Royal High School on Calton Hill

Regent Terrace, Carlton Terrace and Royal Terrace on Calton Hill were built, also Hillside Crescent and some adjoining streets, but the development further north in the direction of Leith was never completed. On the south side of Calton Hill various monuments were erected as well as the Royal High School, designed in Greek revival style by Thomas Hamilton.

== West End ==
For the history and development of the West End of New Town see: West End, Edinburgh.

== Other additions ==
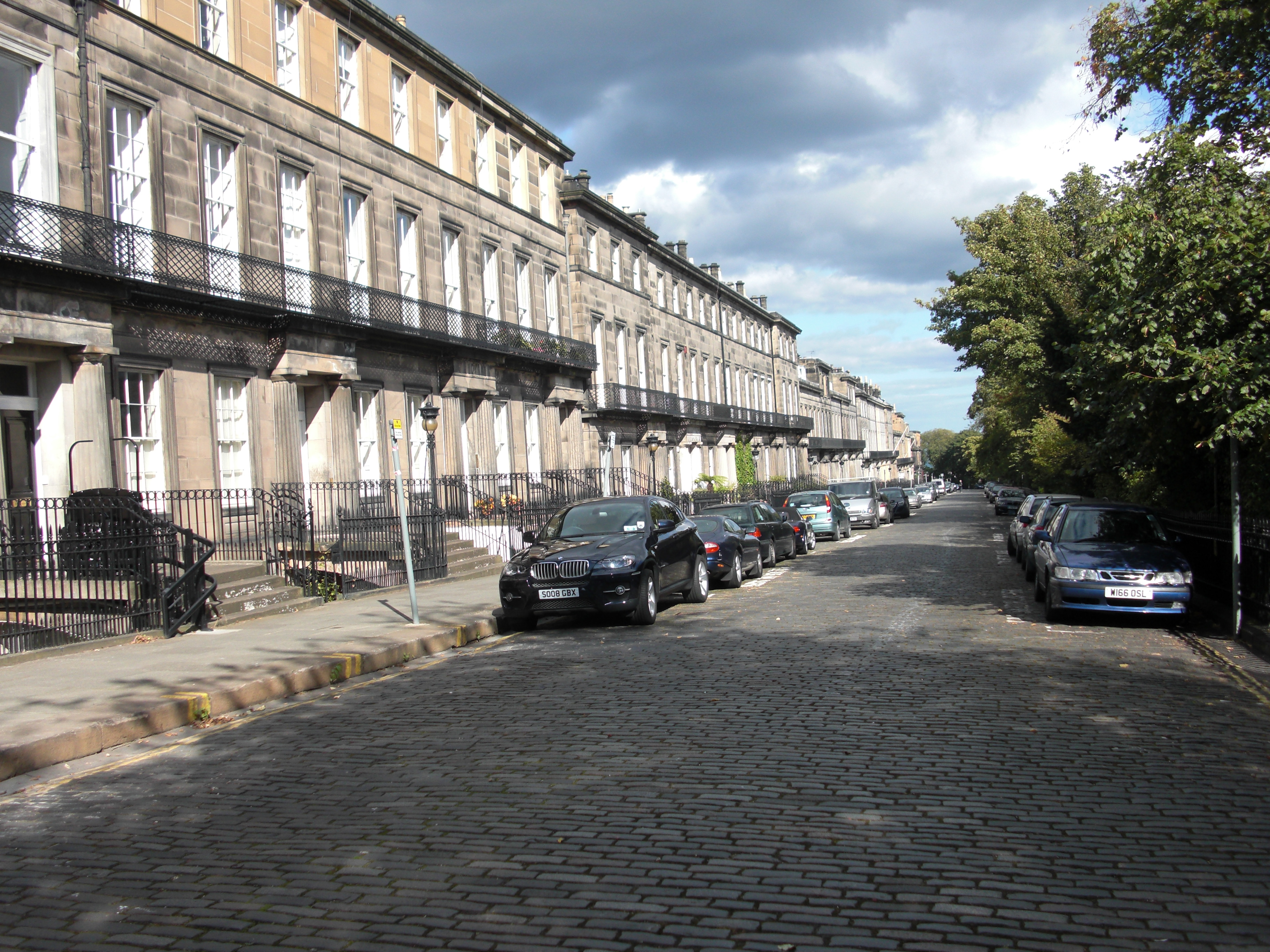
Regent Terrace, part of Playfair's eastern extension of the New Town

A few modest developments in Canonmills were started in the 1820s but none were completed at that time. For several decades the operations of the tannery at Silvermills inhibited development in the immediate vicinity. From the 1830s onward, development slowed but following the completion in 1831 of Thomas Telford’s Dean Bridge, the Dean Estate had some developments built. These included the Dean Orphanage (now the Dean Gallery), Daniel Stewart's College, streets to the Northeast of Queensferry Street (in the 1850s), Buckingham Terrace (in 1860) and Learmonth Terrace (in 1873).

In the 19th century Edinburgh's second railway, the Edinburgh, Leith and Newhaven Railway, built a tunnel under the New Town to link Scotland Street with Canal Street (later absorbed into Waverley Station). After its closure, the tunnel was used to grow mushrooms, and during World War 2 as an air raid shelter.

== Principal losses ==
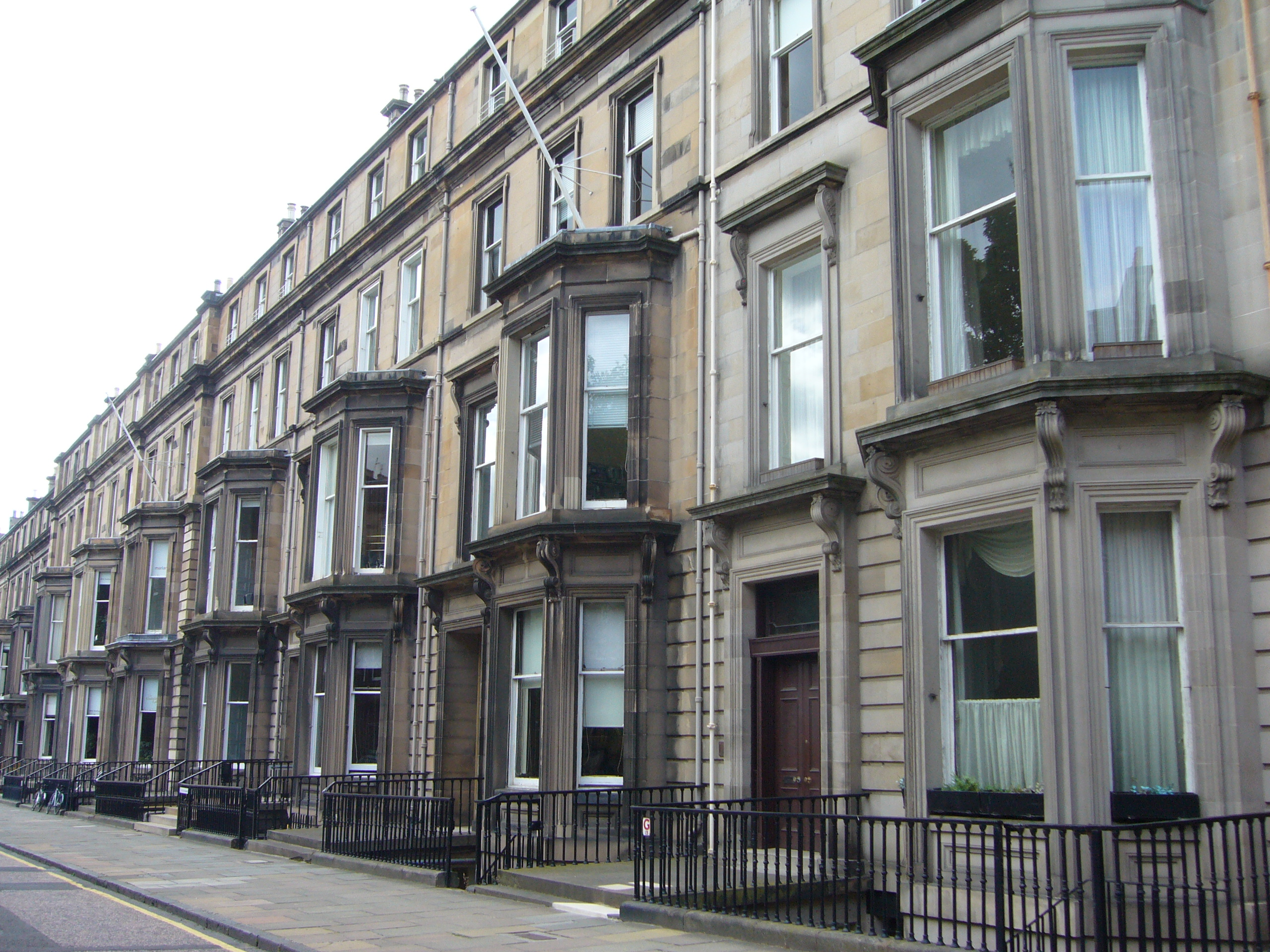
Drumsheugh Gardens. Part of the further western, Victorian extension to the New Town and West End

An attempt to build an elevated walkway along the length of Princes Street involved the planned demolition of the entire street in a radical plan published in the 1960s. The plan was unpopular but before it was abandoned in 1982, seven buildings were removed. The old Boots building at 102 Princes Street, with its series of statues of William Wallace, Robert Burns, Sir Walter Scott and Robert the Bruce, was demolished in 1965. The North British & Mercantile Insurance Company building at number 64 followed. The New Club, designed by William Burn and extended by David Bryce, and the adjacent Life Association of Scotland building by David Rhind and Sir Charles Barry also came down.

Lost streets include those in the St James Square area, demolished in the 1960s to make way for the St James Shopping Centre and offices for the Scottish Office. This mainly tenemental area, reported as having a population of 3,763, was demolished largely on the basis of being slums with only 61 of 1,100 dwellings being considered fit for habitation. Also demolished as slums was most of Jamaica Street at the west end of the Second New Town.

Bellevue House by Robert Adam, which became the Excise or Custom House, was built in 1775, before the New Town extended to the area, in what is now Drummond Place Gardens. Great King Street and London Street in the Northern or Second New Town were aligned on this building but it was demolished in the 1840s due to the construction of the Scotland Street railway tunnel below.

== Culture ==
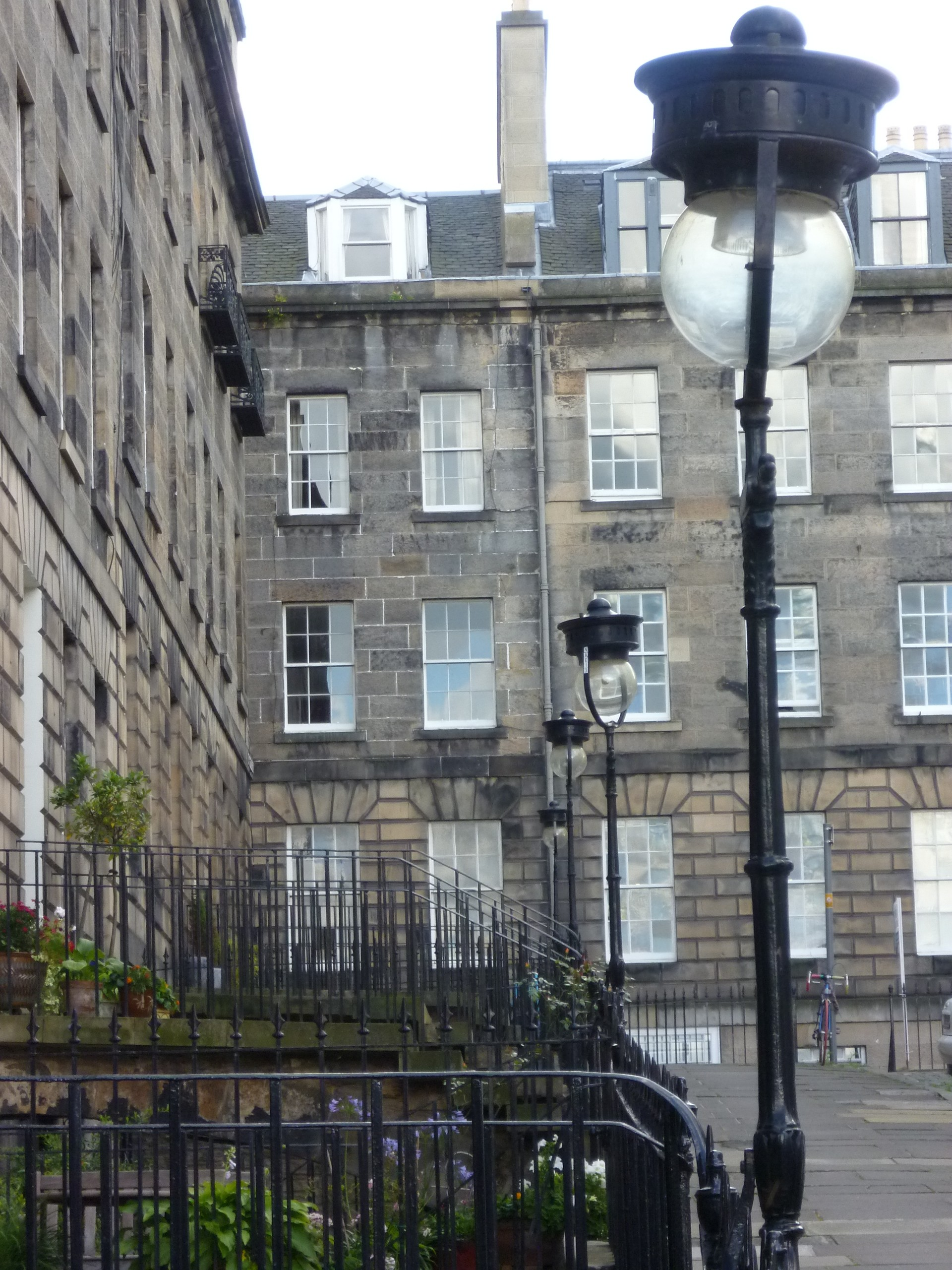
Typical New Town street lamps (in Nelson Street)

The New Town is home to the National Gallery of Scotland and the Royal Scottish Academy Building, both designed by Playfair and located next to each other on The Mound. The Scottish National Portrait Gallery is on Queen Street. Other notable buildings include the Assembly Rooms on George Street, the Balmoral Hotel (formerly called the North British Hotel, after a railway company) with its landmark clock tower above Waverley Station, and the Scott Monument.

The Cockburn Association (Edinburgh Civic Trust) is prominent in campaigning to preserve the architectural integrity of the New Town.

== Shopping ==
The New Town contains Edinburgh's main shopping streets. Princes Street is home to many chain shops, formerly including Jenners department store, an Edinburgh institution. George Street, once the financial centre, now has numerous modern bars, many occupying former banking halls, while Multrees Walk on St. Andrew Square is home to Harvey Nichols and other designer shops. The St. James Centre, at the east end of the New Town, was an indoor mall completed in 1970. Often considered an unwelcome addition to New Town architecture, it included a large branch of John Lewis. The St. James Centre (excluding John Lewis) closed on Sunday, 16 October 2016 and has been demolished. It was redeveloped and reopened in 2021 as the St James Quarter. By the Waverley Station lies Waverley Market, which contains many high street stores, such as Game, Costa, McDonald's, Sainsbury's, KFC, Subway, Superdry and Greggs.

== Notable residents ==
- J M Barrie
- Alexander Graham Bell
- Mary Brunton
- Thomas De Quincey
- Arthur Conan Doyle
- David Hume
- Elsie Inglis
- Ludovic Kennedy
- Joseph Lister
- James Clerk Maxwell
- Peter McLagan
- Ann Katharine Mitchell
- Walter Scott
- Catherine Sinclair
- Moira Shearer
- Mary Somerville
- Robert Louis Stevenson
- Marie Stopes

== See also ==
- Banknotes of Scotland (featured on design)
- History of Edinburgh
- List of Category A listed buildings in the New Town, Edinburgh
- World Heritage Sites in Scotland
