= James Eckford Lauder =

Scottish artist (1811–1869)

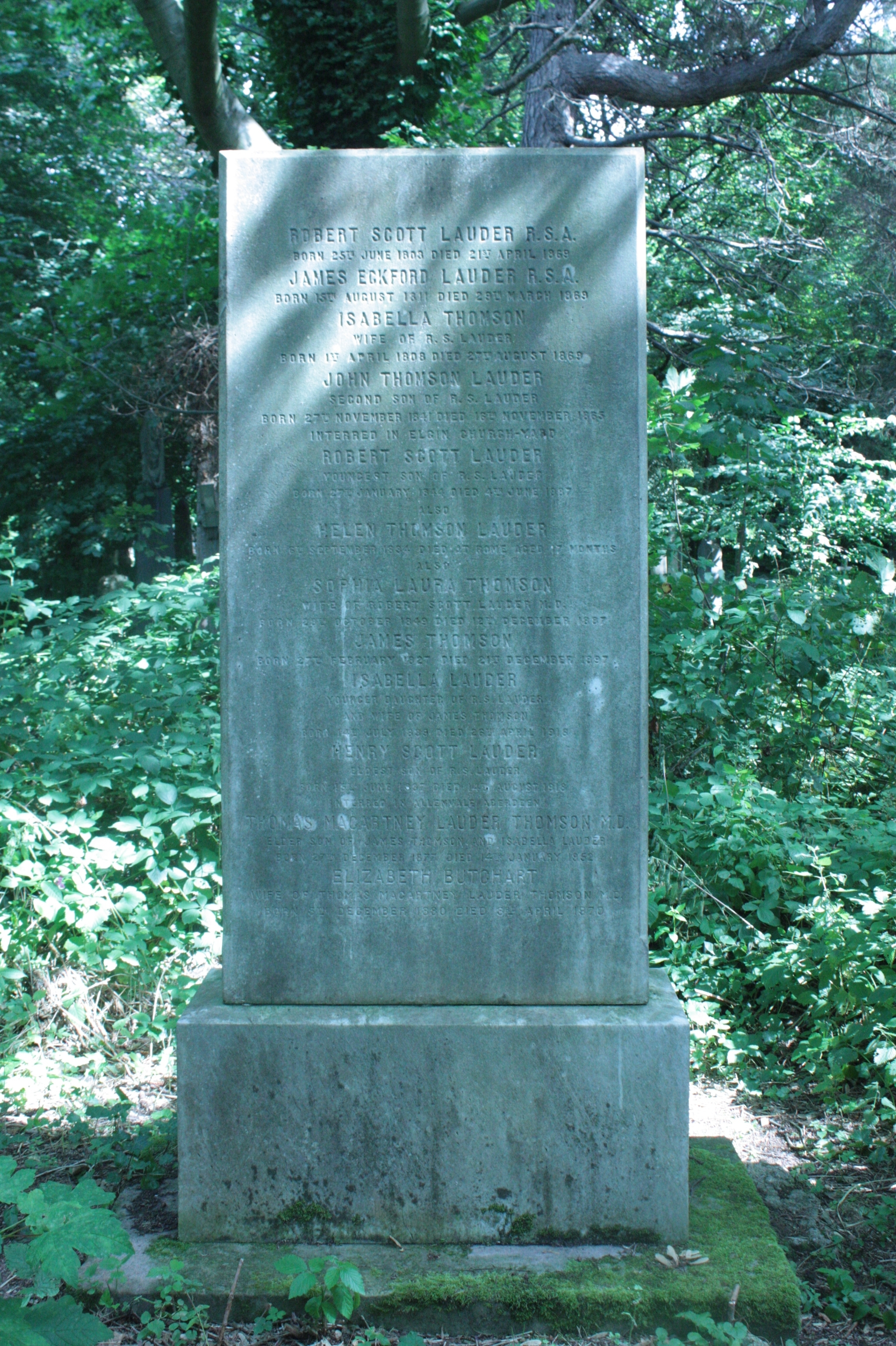
The Lauder grave, Warriston Cemetery

James Eckford Lauder RSA (15 August 1811 – 27 March 1869) was a notable mid-Victorian Scottish artist, famous for both portraits and historical pictures.

== Life and work ==
A younger brother of artist Robert Scott Lauder, he was born at Silvermills, Edinburgh, the 5th and youngest son of John Lauder of Silvermills (proprietor of the great tannery there) by his spouse Helen née Tait. Under the guidance and encouragement of his elder brother Robert, an early love of art was rapidly developed.

James Eckford Lauder attended Edinburgh Academy from 1824 to 1828. In 1834, he joined Robert in Italy, and remained there nearly four years. Upon his return to Edinburgh he became an annual contributor to the Exhibitions of the Royal Scottish Academy, and exhibited occasionally at the Royal Academy in London, where his works attracted much attention.

In 1839, he was elected an associate, and in 1846 became full member, of the Royal Scottish Academy entitling him to the postnominals 'RSA' after his name. In 1847, he sent to the competition in Westminster Hall The Parable of Forgiveness for which he was awarded a premium of two hundred pounds. One of his most successful works, The Wise and Foolish Virgins, was engraved by Lumb Stocks for the Association for the Promotion of the Fine Arts in Scotland.

He never married and died from "exhaustion", at 16 Salisbury Street, Edinburgh.

He is buried with his brother in Warriston Cemetery on the eastern edge of the westmost path, towards the south end of the original cemetery.

The following are said to be amongst his principal pictures:

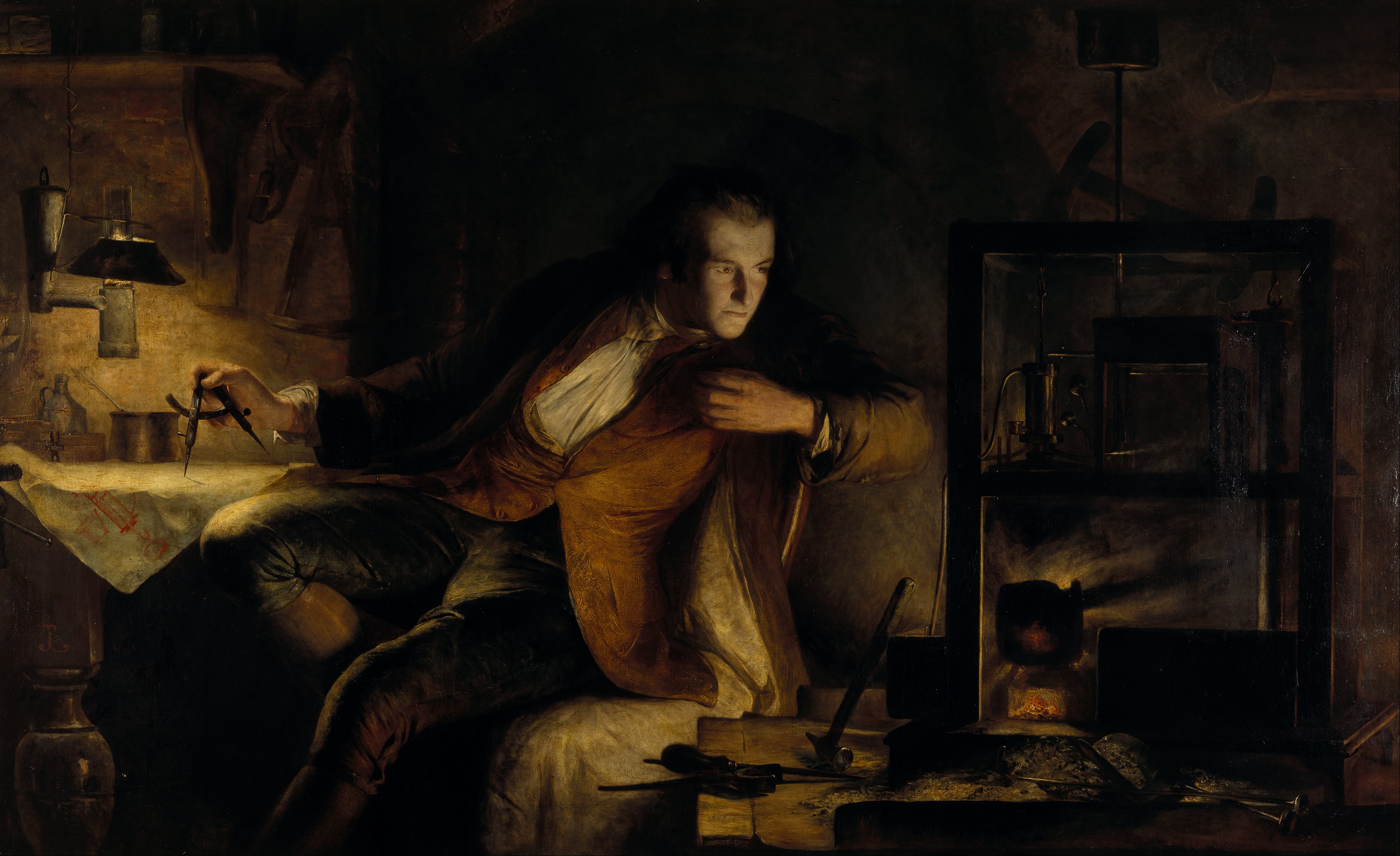
Lauder: James Watt and the Steam Engine: the Dawn of the Nineteenth Century, 1855

- Hagar
- The Unjust Servant (see Parable of the Unjust Steward)
- The Wise and Foolish Virgins
- Scene from The Two Gentlemen of Verona (1841)
- Cherries (1842)
- Hop-Scotch (1843)
- Night and Day (1845)
- Bailie Duncan McWheeble at Breakfast (1854)
- James Watt and the Steam Engine (1855; National Gallery of Scotland, Edinburgh)
- Self-portrait
- Sir Walter Scott
