= Canonmills =

District of Edinburgh, Scotland

Coordinates: 55°57′45.09″N 3°11′59.33″W

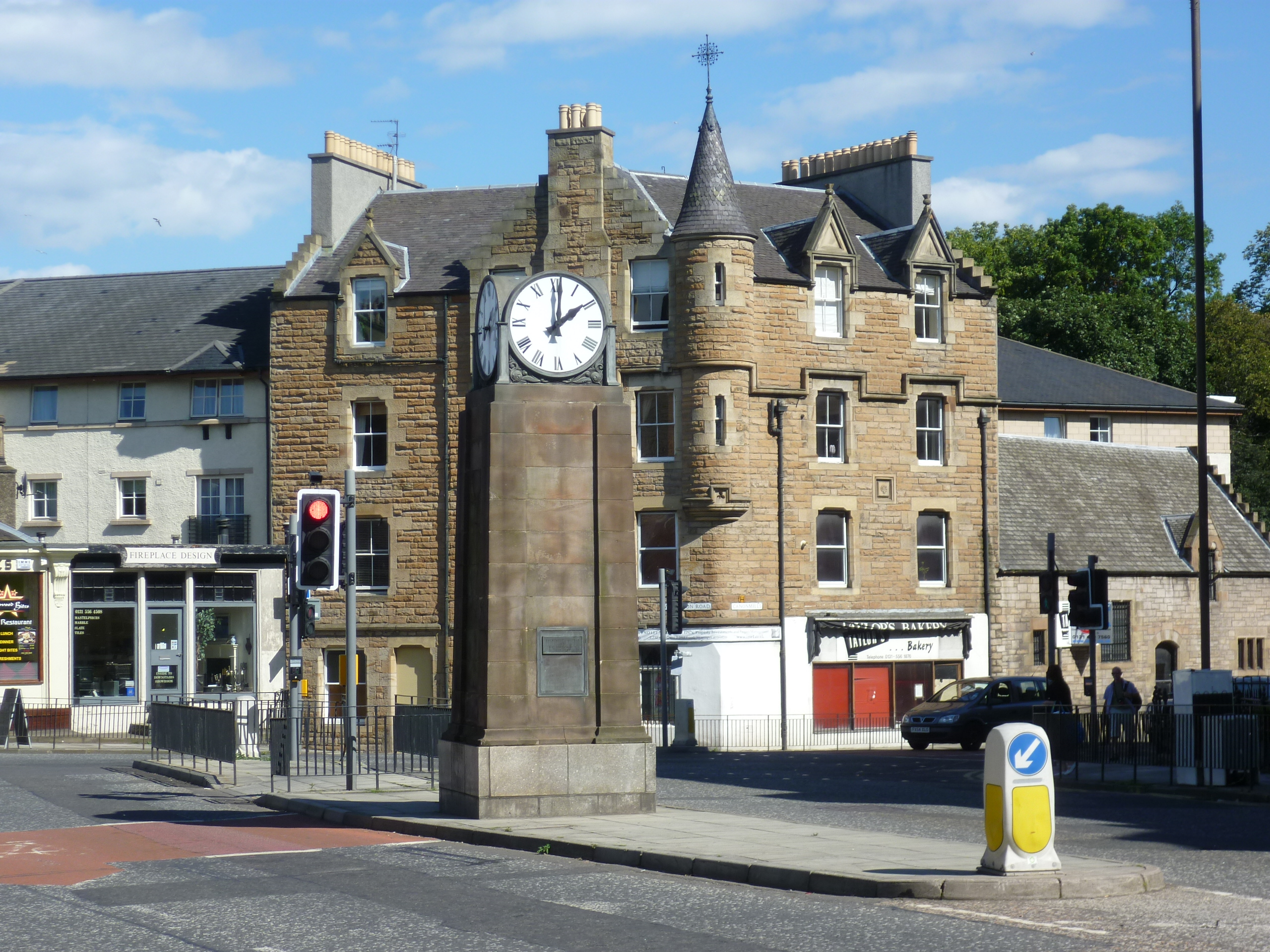
Canonmills Clock

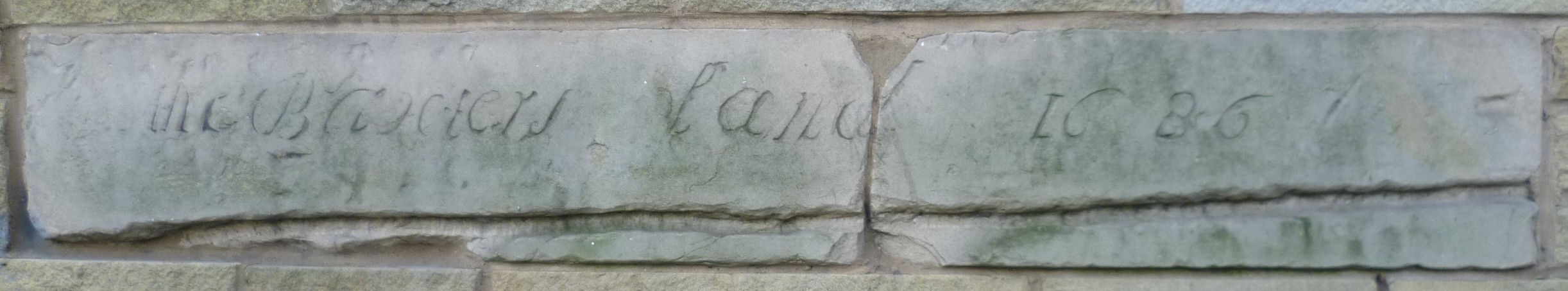
Baxters Land lintel dated 1686

Canonmills is a district of Edinburgh, the capital of Scotland. It lies to the south east of the Royal Botanic Garden at Inverleith, east of Stockbridge and west of Bellevue, in a low hollow north of Edinburgh's New Town. The area was formerly a loch which was drained in three phases in the 18th and 19th centuries, disappearing finally in 1865.

== History ==
=== Holyrood Abbey ===
Formerly a small village, Canonmills owes its origins and name, in the same way as The Canongate, to the Augustinian canons of Holyrood Abbey who operated a mill here from the 12th century. It is shown pictorially as a cluster of buildings, three of which have waterwheels, on the 1560 Siege of Leith map. At a later period a mill lade from the Water of Leith reached the area via the village of Silvermills to the east. The Incorporation of Baxters (bakers) in the Canongate were compelled by law to have their corn ground at the Canonmills, and during demolition work carried out in 1964 to enlarge a local filling station a stone was unearthed bearing the inscription, "The Baxters Land 1686". It is now incorporated into a wall of the Canonmills Service Station. The only surviving building of the original village is a pantile-roofed former mill building on the corner of Eyre Place and Canon Street. Until c.1995 further remnants existed on Eyre Terrace.

=== Canonmills Loch ===
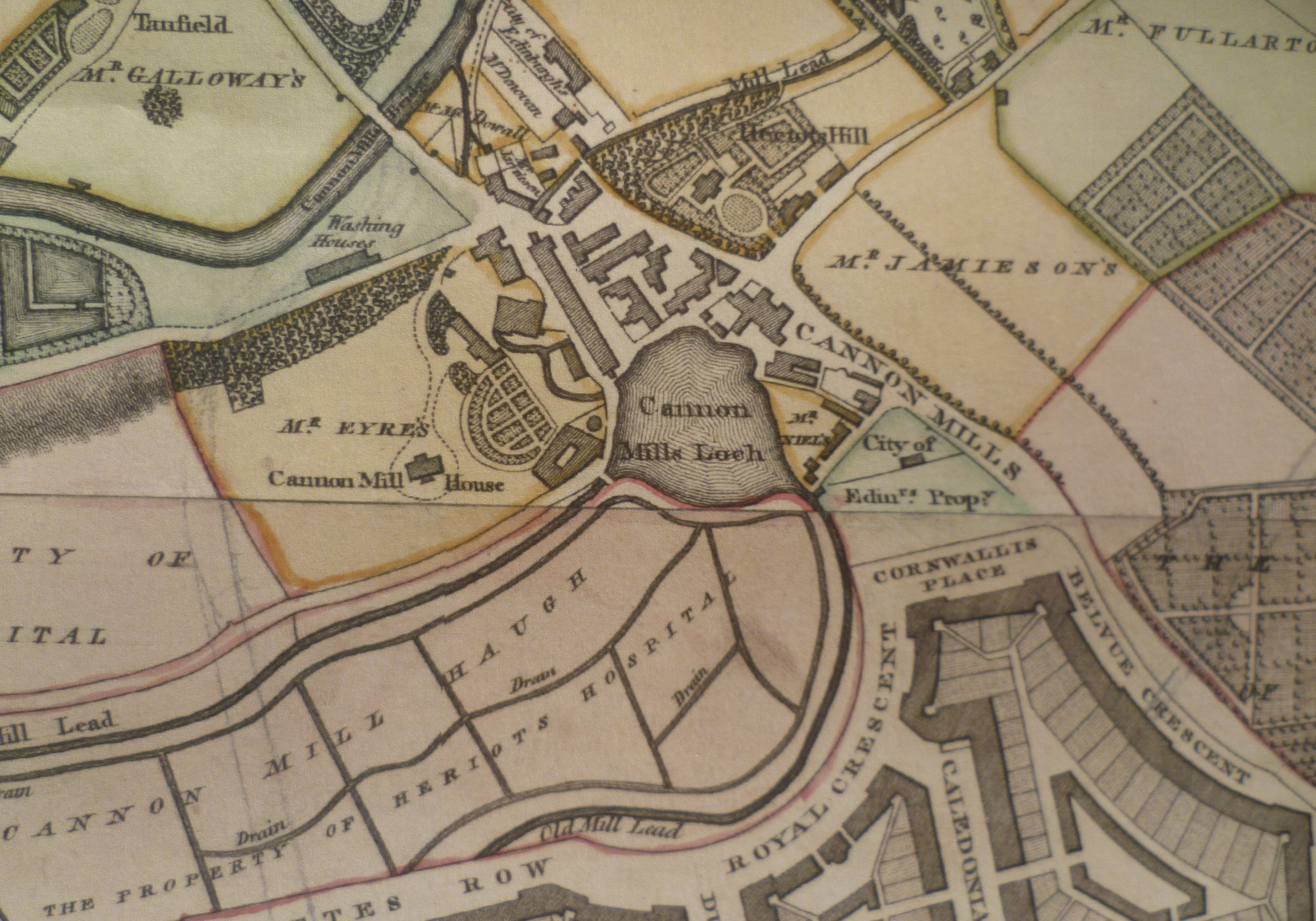
Canonmills Loch shown on a map from 1804

In winter this small man-made loch was used for curling. Canonmills Curling Society were painted by David Allan c.1796 (which is also one of the earliest paintings of this area). The loch survived until the late 19th century, at which point it was infilled and built over.

=== George V Park ===
The George V Park, occupying the old Canon Mill Haugh to the south east, used to be a popular sporting arena. With the final draining of the loch in 1865 it became the site of the Royal Patent Gymnasium, described by James Grant as "...one of the most remarkable and attractive places of its kind in Edinburgh", created "at considerable expense for the purpose of affording healthful and exhilarating recreation in the open air". The principal feature was the circular Great Sea Serpent which could seat 600 rowers embarking and disembarking at four separate piers. Other attractions were the Self-Adjusting Trapeze enabling up to 100 patrons at a time to swing by the hands "over a distance of 130 feet from one trapeze to the other", the Giant's Sea-Saw, 100 feet long by 7 wide, which could elevate 200 people to a height of 50 feet, and the Patent Velocipede Paddle Merry-go-Round propelled by the feet of 600 passengers.

=== Scotland Street Tunnel ===
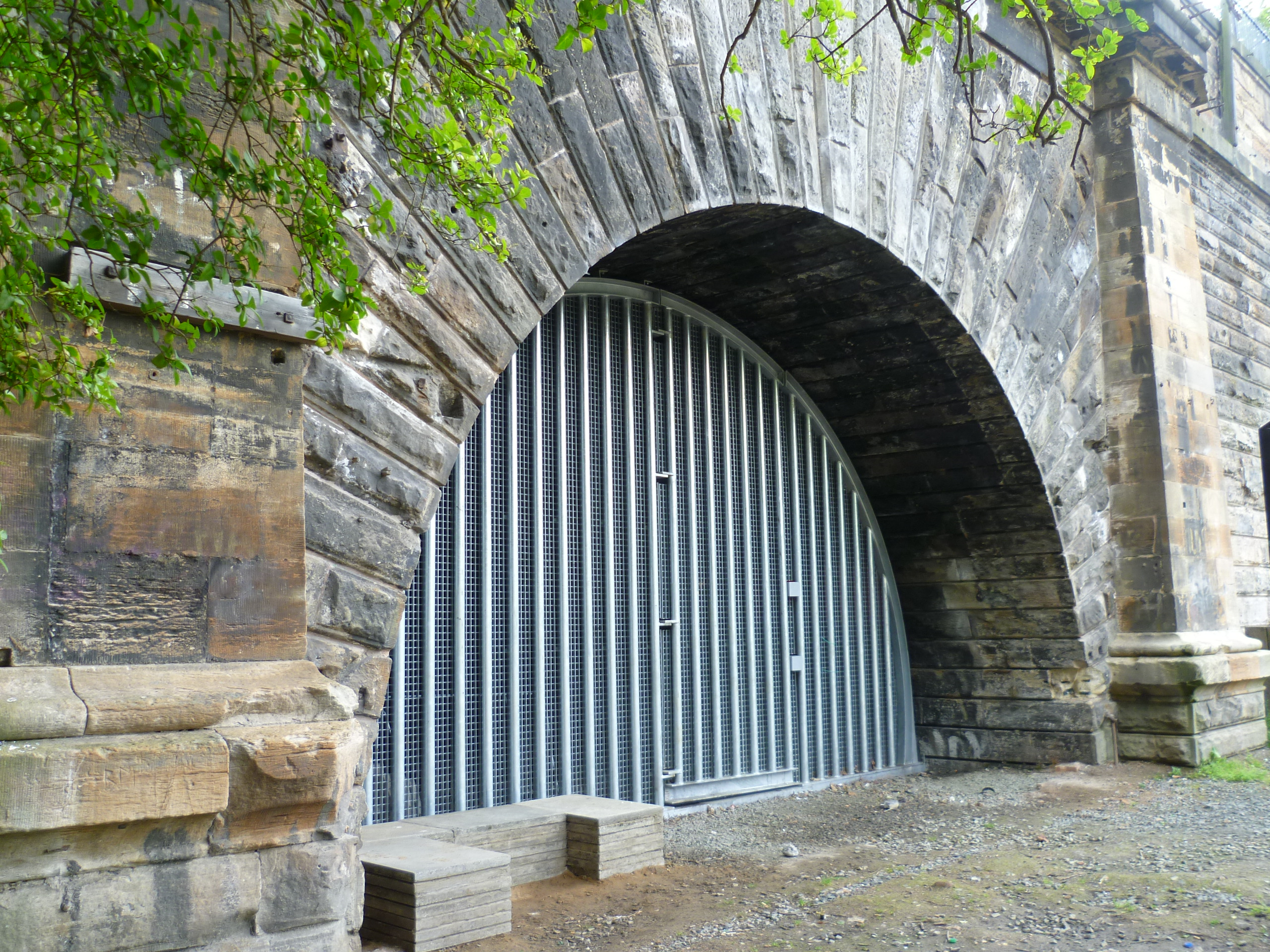
Northern end of the Scotland Street Tunnel

At the southern edge of the Park, in the cliff-like drop from the streets of the New Town, lies the northern end of the Scotland Street Tunnel which once provided an underground rail link to Canal Street Station on the site of present-day Waverley Station. The tunnel, built under Scotland Street in 1847 by the Edinburgh, Leith and Newhaven Railway, is three quarters of a mile long and descends a 1 in 27 gradient. Trains descended the tunnel under gravity, controlled by two men operating handbrakes in two front wagons. Robert Louis Stevenson described the appearance in his 'Edinburgh: Picturesque Notes' (1879): "The Scotland Street Station, the sight of the train shooting out of its dark maw with the two guards upon the brake, the thought of its length and the many ponderous edifices and thoroughfares above, were certainly things of paramount impressiveness to a young mind." For the return journey, 150mm steel cables were attached to the trains which were pulled up the slope by a stationary winding-engine at the Waverley end.

== Buildings ==
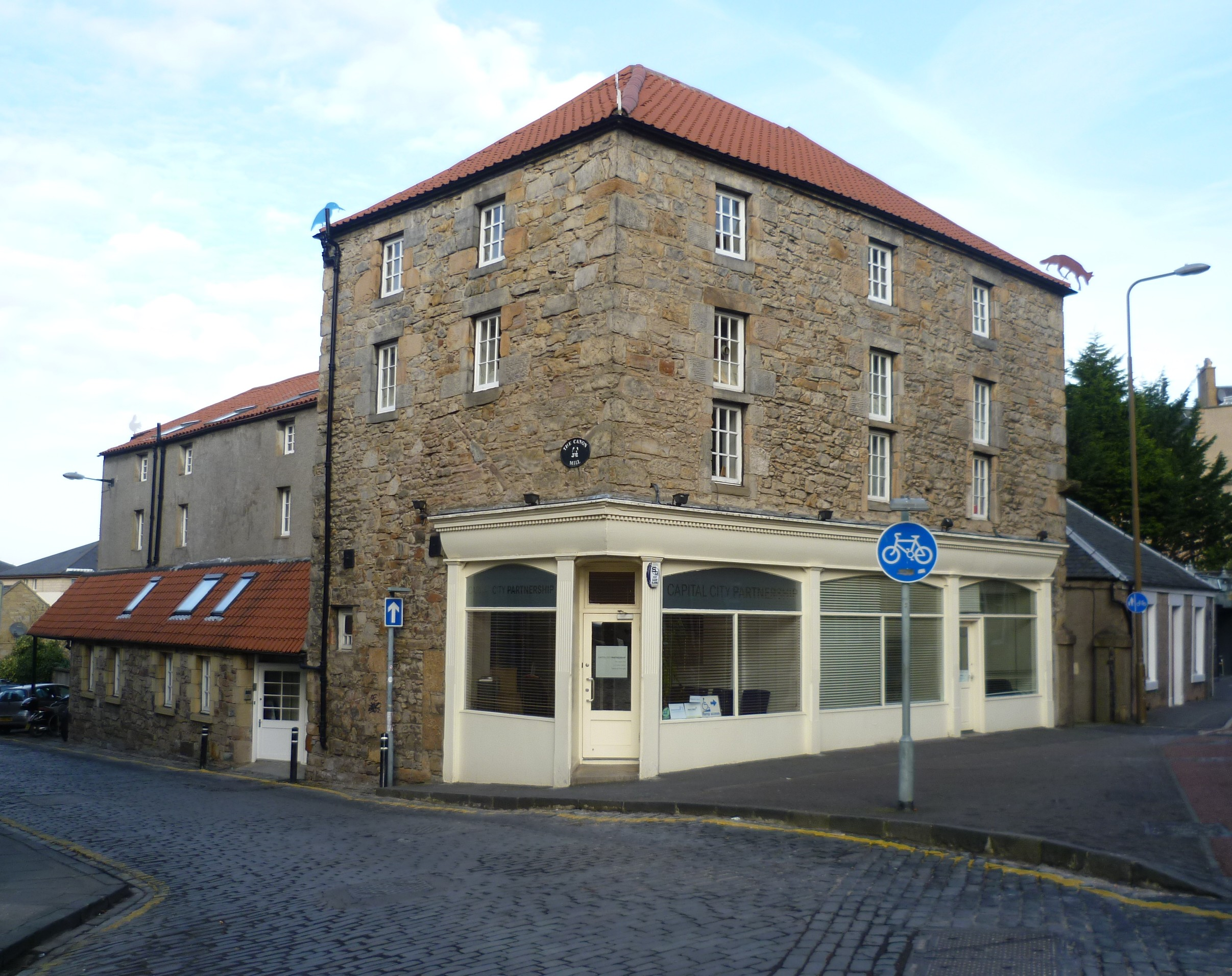
Canon Mill, the only surviving mill building

The bridge (generally called Canonmills Bridge) linking Canonmills to Inverleith Row was built in 1767, its single arch replaced by three arches in 1840. It was widened in 1896.

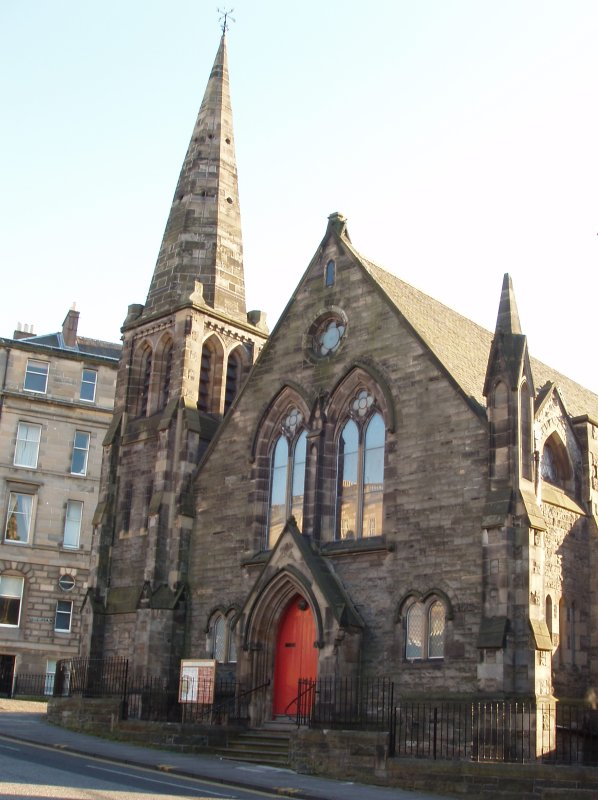
Bellevue Chapel in 2005

The deep elliptical crescent of Eyre Crescent was built around Canonmills (or Eyre) House which was replaced in 1880-1 by a United Presbyterian Church which in turn has been replaced by a modern medical centre. A little lodge-type building on Rodney Street is the old school, where Sir Walter Scott's father was educated.

Bellevue Chapel is a Victorian gothic church located in Rodney Street. The church is an independent Evangelical congregation. The building was constructed from 1878-1881, and was originally a Lutheran place of worship for German residents of Edinburgh and those that were building the Forth Bridge. During the First World War, the German congregants vacated the building and, in 1919, the Christian Brethren in Edinburgh moved into the building renamed it Bellevue Chapel.

== Famous Residents ==
The sculptor Stewart McGlashan had his granite yard at Canonmills Bridge and lived opposite, at 5 Brandon Street.
