= Bellevue, Edinburgh =

District of Edinburgh, Scotland

Coordinates: 55°57′37″N 3°11′36″W

Bellevue (/ˈbɛlvjuː/ BEL-vew) is a district of Edinburgh, the capital of Scotland. It lies to the south east of Canonmills, west of Leith Walk and south of Leith, incorporating the easternmost extent of the Second or Northern part of Edinburgh's New Town, a UNESCO heritage site. It takes its name from Bellevue House, a pre-existing mansion that, as the Northern New Town was developed, came to be located in the central garden of Drummond Place.

== History ==
=== The Royal Edinburgh Zoological Gardens ===
Scotland's first zoo was called The Royal Edinburgh Zoological Gardens, preceding the current Edinburgh Zoo by nearly a century. It was situated south of East Claremont Street, in the gardens of Broughton Hall, then owned by James Donaldson and opened as a zoological park nine years after his death in 1830.

The Zoological Gardens were also frequently used as a venue for concerts, acrobatics shows and displays of fireworks and Montgolfier balloons .

With the animals suffering from disease, cramped cages - the whole site covered only 6-acre (2.4 ha) - and unsuitable climate, the park was closed after less than 20 years. In 1857 the house was demolished and the gardens redeveloped as new tenement buildings, the residents of which continued to pay feuduty to the Donaldson Trust until its abolition in Scotland on 28 November 2004.

== Buildings ==
=== Bellevue Crescent ===
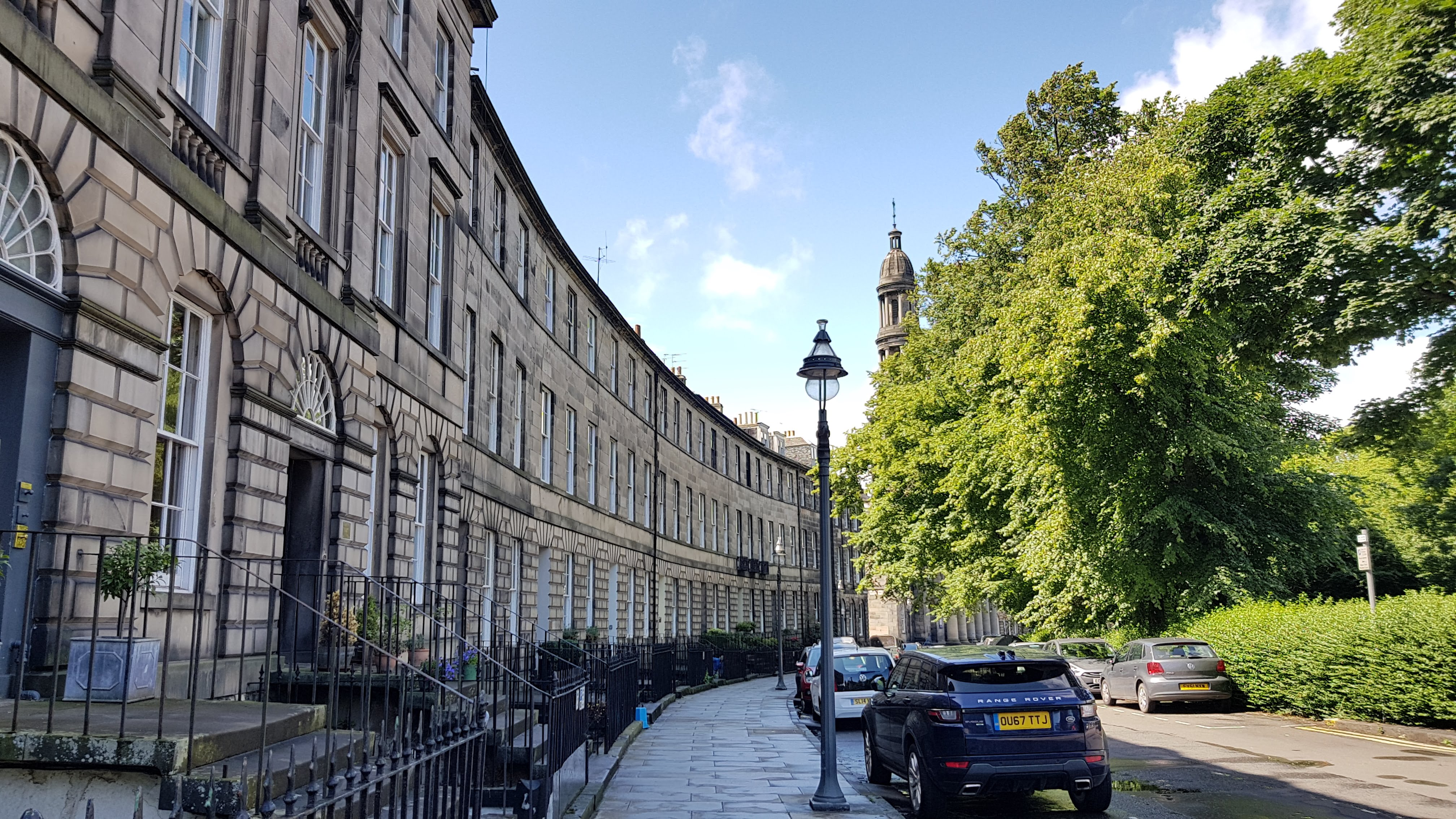
Bellevue Crescent, Edinburgh, UK. Facing North

Bellevue Crescent is a classical 34-bay sweeping curved terrace, part of the first extension of the New Town planned by Robert Reid and William Sibbald in 1802, designed by architect Thomas Bonnar in 1818.

Construction started the following year in 1819. However, the design had to be radically revised after the finalisation of the location of Bellevue Church at the apex of the sweep of the crescent in 1822.

The southern section was completed in 1832, but the northern section was not built for another 50 years, until 1882–4, still following the original facade design, but slightly modified by David Cousin.

=== Broughton St Mary’s ===
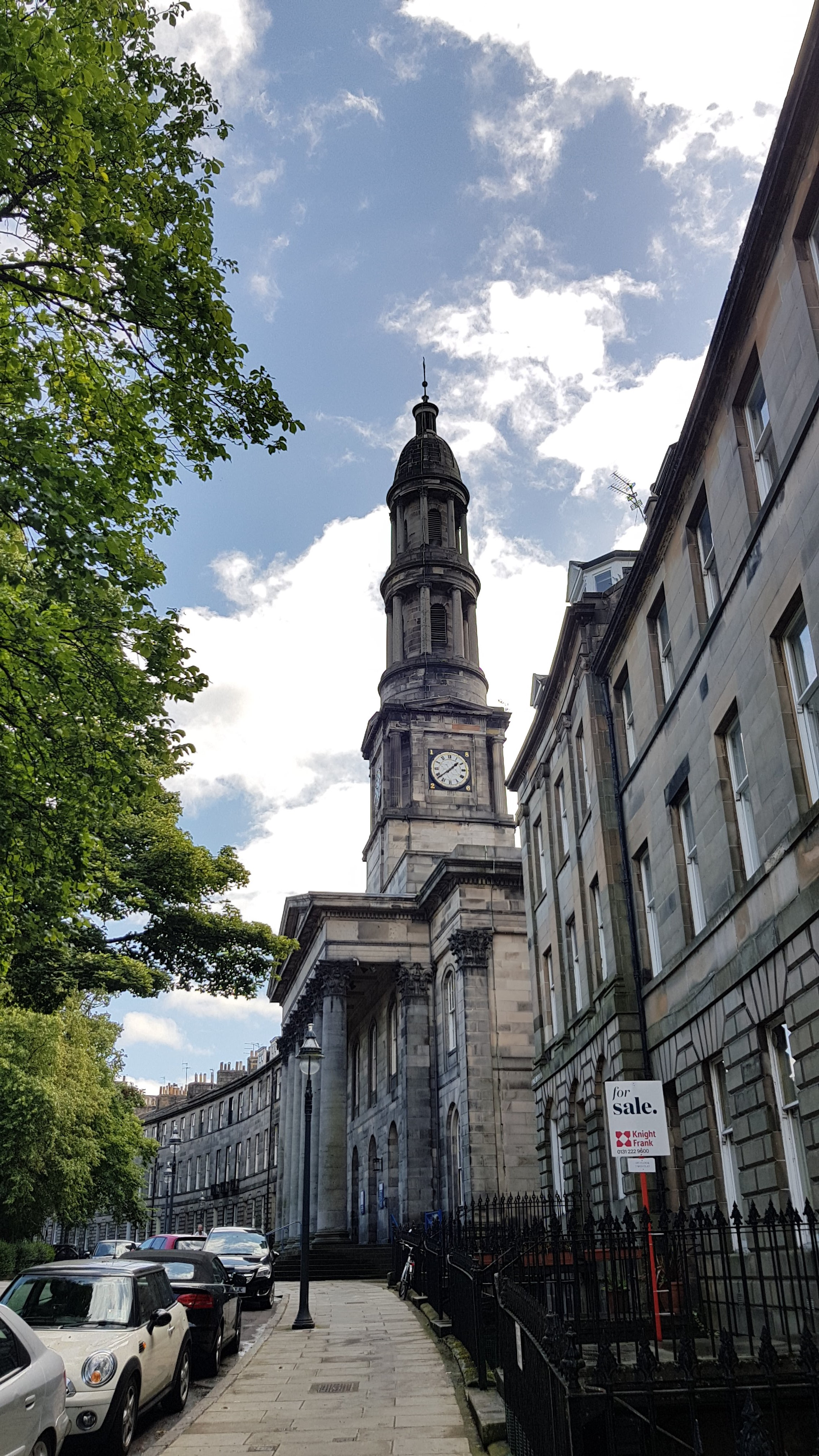
Broughton St Marys Church, Edinburgh, UK. Side elevation, facing south

Originally the structure was known simply as Bellevue Church (not to be confused with the smaller Bellevue Chapel, directly north of Bellevue Crescent), then named St Mary's Parish Church. It finally became Broughton St Mary's in 1992 as a result of the union with Broughton McDonald Church.

Designed by architect Thomas Brown (then Superintendent of City Works for Edinburgh), the site for the Church was finalised on 11 September 1822 at the northern extent of Edinburgh's New Town development. Although the Church was opened for public worship on 12 December 1824, the striking and unusual colonnaded tower was not finished until the following year and the clock was not installed for another year after that. Other notable features include the stained glass windows installed in 1864, the unusual heavily embossed wallpaper added in 1897 to resemble wooden panelling around the gallery and the organ, built by Thomas Lewis of London, and installed in 1882.

The pulpit, based on the Athenian Choragic Monument of Lysicrates, is one of the few surviving pulpits of the 1820s and reputedly the highest in Scotland.

=== The Botanic Cottage ===
At the entrance to the Royal Botanic Garden in its Leith Walk based incarnation, in 1764, the "Botanic Cottage" was built, designed by John Adam and James Craig (designer of Edinburgh's New Town plan). It served as a home for the principal gardener, a classroom where medical student were taught botany and the main entry point to the gardens through doors in the wing walls.

Despite the Garden's further relocation, this time to Inverleith in 1820, the cottage remained on the garden's original site, facing Leith Walk, for nearly another two hundred years, in an increasing state of disrepair and in the early 2000s it was earmarked for demolition.

In 2008, after a community campaign, the building was painstakingly relocated stone by numbered stone over 8 years to a site within the current gardens.

=== Edinburgh Central Bus Depot ===
Originally designed by G M Holmes and Ebenezer James MacRae, and constructed of red brick with ashlar red sandstone dressings and incorporating a large, central, circular glass dome cupola in just a remarkable few weeks in 1922 for the Edinburgh Exhibition Association as Edinburgh's Industrial Exhibition Hall, the building briefly played host to many large national shows through the 1920s, including the Scottish Motor Show and Edinburgh's Christmas Fun Fair. The building was extended in 1933 to become a bus depot the following year, and extended again 1963.

=== East Claremont Street drill hall ===
East Claremont Street drill hall was designed by Thomas Duncan Rhind in the free Renaissance style, facing on to East Claremont Street, directly west of Claremont Crescent.

=== Claremont Crescent ===
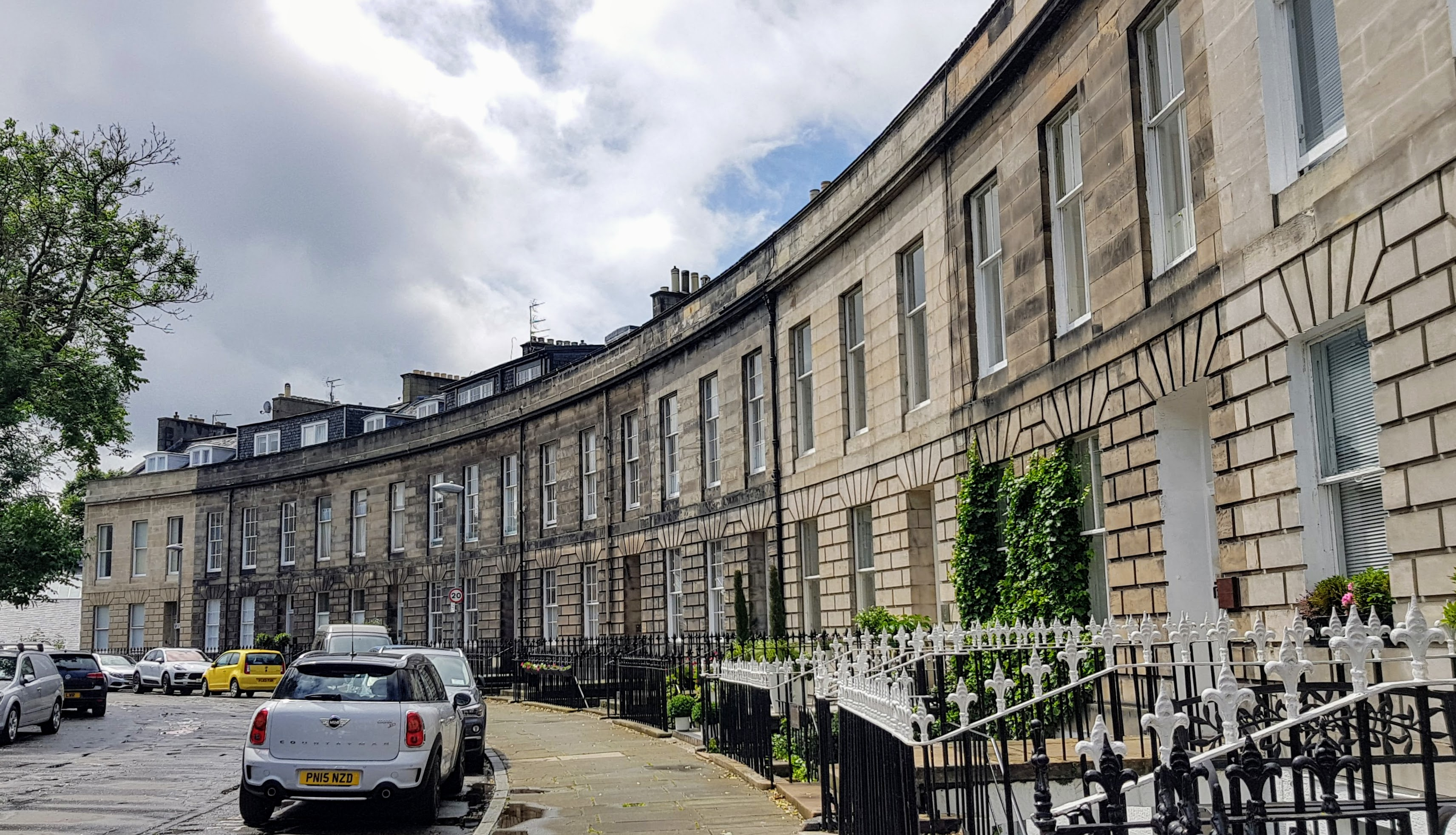
Claremont Crescent, Edinburgh, UK. Facing West

Originally designed by William Burn in 1823, sited at the summit of Sandy Hill (led to by the later added West Annandale Street), allowing it to look across the grounds of Broughton Hall to the then Royal Botanic Garden and beyond that, Calton Hill, Claremont Crescent is an A listed small, neo-classic crescent terrace, completed in 1860 by Charles Kinnear and John Dick Peddie.

=== Mansfield Traquair Centre ===
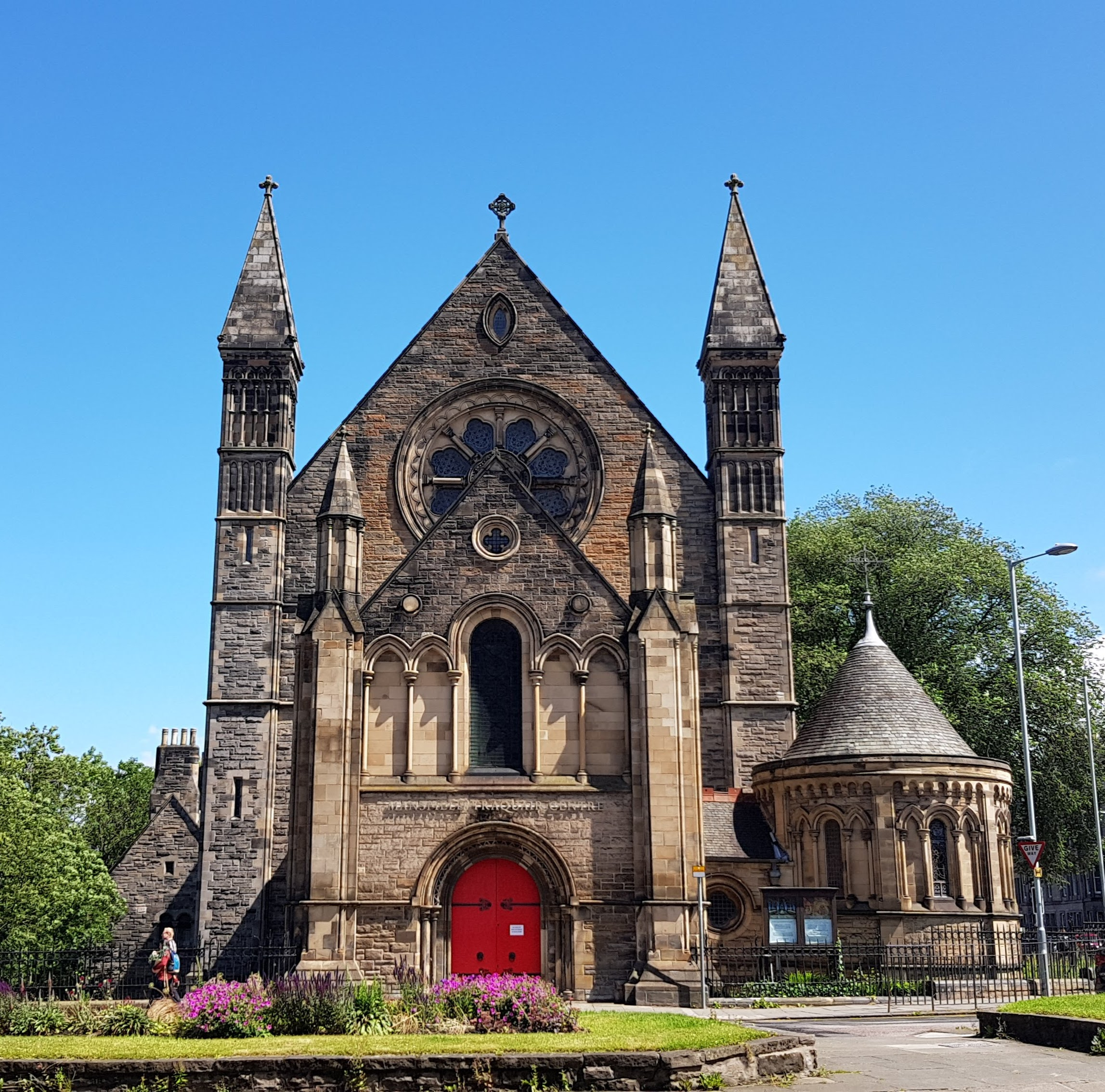
Mansfield Traquair Centre, Edinburgh, UK. Front elevation.

The murals inside the former Catholic Apostolic Church, designed by Robert Rowand Anderson - regarded as his most ambitious ecclesial project - and built in 1893 are Phoebe Anna Traquair's best-known work and led to the building to become often referred to as "Edinburgh’s Sistine Chapel" and confirmed her international recognition.

=== McDonald Road Power Station ===
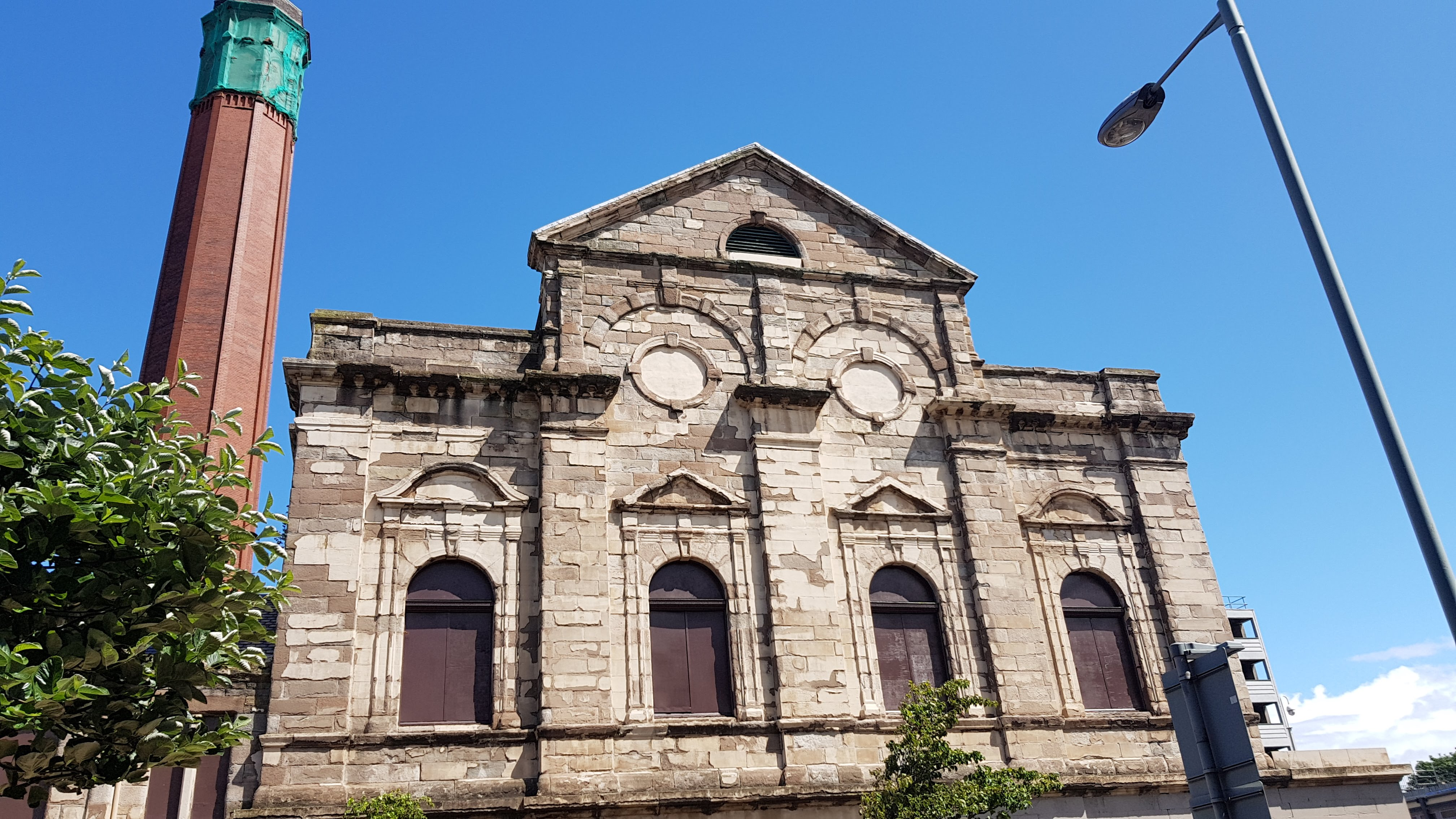
McDonald Road Power Station, Edinburgh, UK. Front elevation

Designed by John Cooper and built in 1899, this former coal–fired power station highly unusually had an Italian Renaissance basilica style sandstone frontage. The station originally powered the Leith Walk tram system and although it still houses an operational sub station, the building is in such poor repair, with the frontage now badly disintegrating, that it was put on the Buildings at Risk register in 2009, where it remains. The towering red brick chimney stack, however, is well preserved.

=== Claremont Court Estate ===
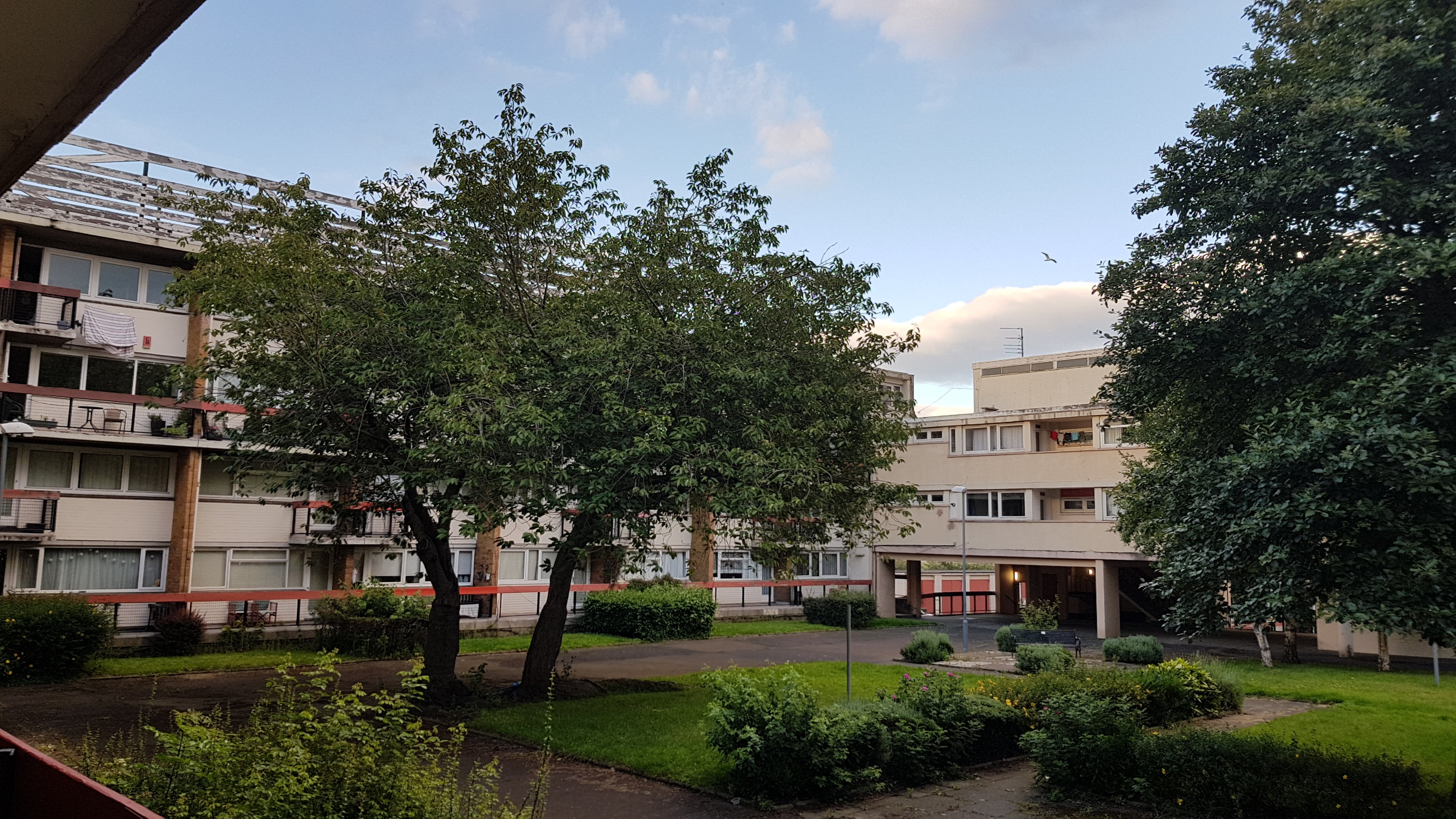
Claremont Court housing estate, facing East

Claremont Court is a rare example of a modernist style municipal flatted housing scheme (surrounding a landscape courtyard) situated this close to the New Town UNESCO zone. The scheme was designed by Basil Spence and Partners (Peter Ferguson, partner in charge; Richard Cassidy, job architect; T Harley Haddow, engineers), constructed between 1959 and 1962 and Category C listed 19 July 2011 as an important example of Scottish post-war housing.

== Famous Residents ==
- Robert Louis Stevenson’s grandfather, Robert Stevenson, was an Elder of Bellevue Church from 1828 to 1843 whilst also Engineer to the Northern Lighthouse Board.
- Sir George Makgill, 9th Baronet, resident at 12 Claremont Crescent during the 1850s.
- Thomas Brumby Johnston, resident at 9 Claremont Crescent.
