= National Institution of Fine Arts =

Coordinates: 51.507138°N 0.140107°W

The National Institution of Fine Arts was a short-lived Victorian-era art society founded in London to provide alternative exhibition space for artists. Dante Gabriel Rossetti and Ford Madox Brown notably exhibited there.

The organisation began as the "Institution for the Free Exhibition of Modern Art" in 1847 ("Free Exhibition" for short), and mounted shows from 1848–49 in a temporary building known as "St. George's Gallery" on Knightsbridge (road), next to Hyde Park, London. Its purpose was stated in an 1848 catalogue, "Freedom for the Artist, certainty of Exhibition for his works, and the Improvement of the Public Taste." The society then changed its name to the "National Institution of Fine Arts" ("National Institution" for short) and from 1850–61 exhibited works at the old Portland Gallery at 316 Regent Street.

The National Institution aimed to provide a less-restrictive and more equitable alternative to the established exhibitions at places like the Royal Academy. The organisers allocated space by lottery, so there was no favouritism, allowed artists more control over the display of their pictures, and space was cheaper — making it more accessible to women artists who suffered discrimination by other exhibiting bodies. The exhibition was "free" in the sense that any artist was welcome to exhibit.

Dante Gabriel Rossetti exhibited his first major oil painting, The Girlhood of Mary Virgin, at the Free Exhibition in March 1849, and in April 1850 Ecce Ancilla Domini! at the National Institution. Ford Madox Brown also exhibited there in 1848 with Wycliffe reading his Translation of the New Testament to John of Gaunt and in 1849 with The Young Mother and Lear and Cordelia.

Robert Scott Lauder was the first president of the National Institution.

Chambers's Edinburgh Journal described exhibitors at the National Institution as "..mainly composed of dissenters from the other associations — gentlemen who conceive that they have been ill-treated by Hanging Committees, and a large class of juvenile but promising artists, who resort to the less crowded institutions in the hope of there meeting with better places for their works than in the older and more established bodies".
