= Silvermills =

Coordinates: 55°57′31″N 3°12′13″W

Silvermills, once an ancient village, has been part of Edinburgh, Scotland, since 1809.

The name most likely comes from mills erected to smelt and refine silver ore which had been found at Hilderstone in 1607, or from alchemical projects of James IV or James V.

Silvermills was incorporated into Edinburgh in 1809 under the Edinburgh Improvement Act of 1809.

The brothers Robert Scott Lauder and James Eckford Lauder, 19 the century artists, were born in Silvermills.
