= St Michael and All Angels Church, Colwinston =

Church in Colwinston, Wales

Coordinates: 51.46759°N 3.52793°W

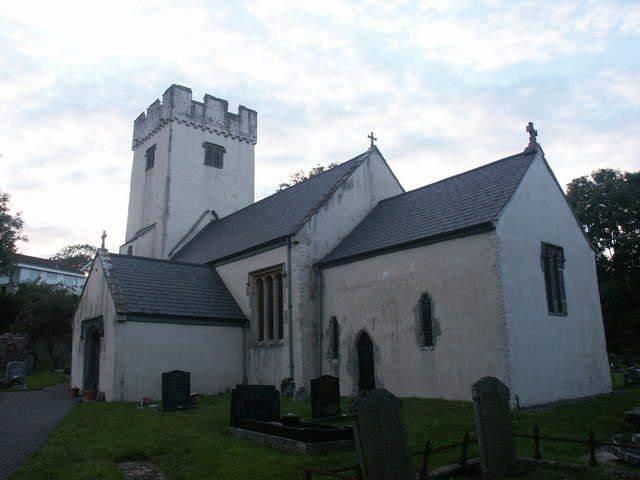
St Michael and All Angels Church

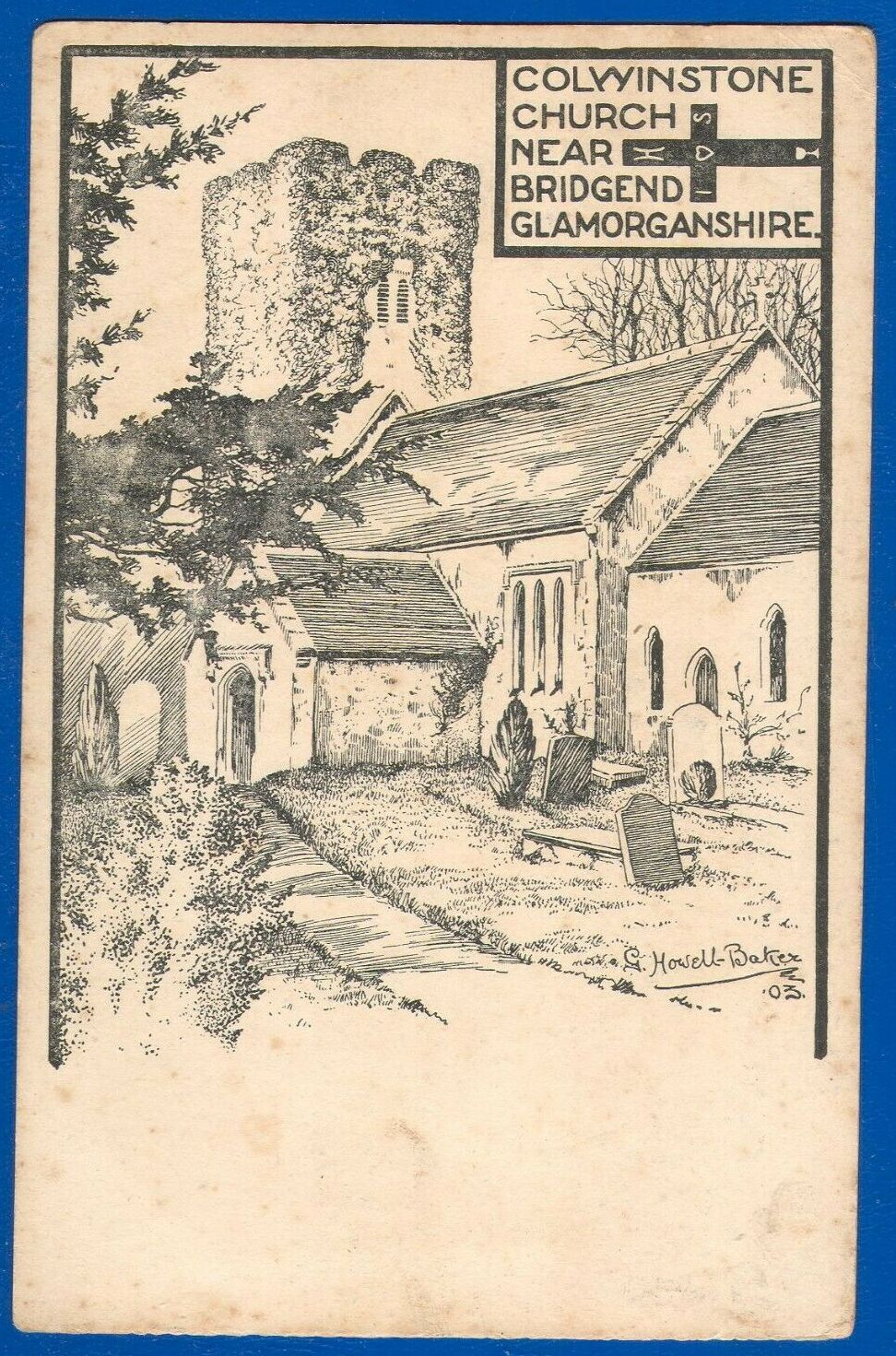
"Colwinstone Church" on a 1903 postcard designed and published by the artist G. Howell-Baker

St Michael and All Angels Church is a Grade I listed church in Colwinston, in the Vale of Glamorgan, south Wales. It became a Grade I listed building on 22 February 1963. The church is said to have been built in 1111. The earliest mention of this parish church comes in the form of an 1141 confirmation of a donation made to the church by Maurice de Londres. The church and all of its possessions were given to the Abbey of Gloucester; this was confirmed circa 1200 when the Bishop of Landaff assigned a resident chaplain to the church. In 1254, the church was listed with a valuation of five marks. By 1291, it was combined with the valuation of Ewenny Priory.

The church has many medieval wall paintings. Traces remain on the west wall of the chancel arch, depicting the consecration of Saint Nicholas, Bishop of Myra and the story of the young mother who left her baby in the bathtub to attend the service and whose baby was miraculously saved from death by boiling while his mother attended the bishop's consecration. Other subjects are interpreted as St. Vitus and the Enthronement of Thomas Becket. The building was restored in 1879. Henry J Williams of Bristol carried out the work, in the course of which the rood loft was discovered and the doors at the entrance and upper level were replaced and a new door placed in the porch. New windows were inserted in the nave, the old stone pulpit was replaced by an oak one and a new oak communion table, lectern and chancel furniture were installed. The contractor was Thomas Thomas of Colwinston and the cost of £800 was defrayed by Mrs Mary Collins Prichard who had recently come to live at Pwllywrach and, as patron of the "living", wished to put the church in a good state of repair. In 1881, when additional accommodation was required for the then 64 parishioners, the architect John Prichard reseated the church with open benches at a cost of £120. Many of the church's furnishings date from this time. The wall paintings are reckoned to be 600 years old and are painted in tempura on a fine lime plaster.

After the Reformation, when a wooden holy table was often substituted for the original stone ‘mensa’ or altar table, the stone altar of St Michael's was thrown into the churchyard and lies on the south side of the churchyard at right angles to the gravestones. The Pre-Reformation bell which the square medieval tower with its battlement was built to carry has survived with its Latin inscription “Sancte Michael ora pro nobis” (Pray for us St Michael), invoking the saint to which to church is dedicated. There were originally 3 bells in the tower but two were broken and the metal sold in 1722 to pay for the reseating of the church.

In 1971, the church was damaged by a fire. To prepare for the 2000 Millennium, the church was redecorated and reroofed; a new north vestry and entrance were also part of this project. The churchyard cross and wall were both listed as Grade II buildings on 23 July 2003.
