= Colwinston =

Village and community in Wales

Colwinston: Welsh: Tregolwyn
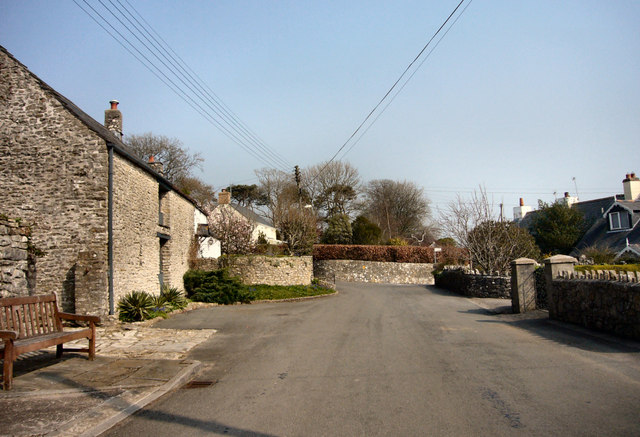

- Location within the Vale of Glamorgan
- Population: 447 (2011)
- OS grid reference: SS943755
- Principal area: Vale of Glamorgan
- Preserved county: South Glamorgan
- Country: Wales
- Sovereign state: United Kingdom
- Post town: Cowbridge
- Postcode district: CF71
- Police: South Wales
- Fire: South Wales
- Ambulance: Welsh
- UK Parliament: Vale of Glamorgan
- Senedd Cymru – Welsh Parliament: Vale of Glamorgan
- List of places UK Wales Vale of Glamorgan 51.46853°N 3.52599°W Map of the community

Colwinston (historically sometimes Colwinstone; Welsh: Tregolwyn) is both a village and a community in the Vale of Glamorgan, Wales, approximately 4 miles (6.4 km) southeast of the centre of Bridgend and 21 miles (34 km) west of the centre of Cardiff. The village is located within 1/2 mile (0.80 km) of the A48. The population in 2005 was approximately 400 but with recent building development, the population is now estimated at over 600 people.

The novelist Agatha Christie was a frequent visitor, and her descendants still live at the former manor house of Pwllywrach.

== History ==
=== Archaeological and early historical evidence ===
Bronze Age axe heads discovered on land at Highfield Farm and Iron Age kilns suggest that the area was settled during prehistoric times. The impetus for the development of an agrarian village may have been the local geography: a gentle valley going east to west towards the village, providing a water supply and creating a natural bowl, with a present-day exit leading down Church Lane.

Steep slopes in the central part of the village make it unlike other Vale of Glamorgan villages in its topography. The watercourse is now underground but rises to the surface in prolonged wet weather. The older village houses are situated on the higher ground overlooking meadows, possibly built on the sites of older simple dwellings. It is thought the area between Garden and Penlan Cottages and Church Cottage provided protection and water for livestock. Title Deeds and old census records call this area "The Square". A village well is present near Ty Draw Farm, and it is likely that watercress was harvested from the open water course there.

There is evidence of Roman activity in the Vale of Glamorgan, and their link to West Wales was along what would become the route of the A48. Llantwit Major Roman Villa, for example, is thought to have been built on a site occupied since the British Iron Age. (There was another excavation in 1971.) Following the end of Roman rule in Britain, the area was ruled by the medieval "princes" of Morgannwg; their kingdom included the area later known as Glamorgan. During this period the settlement came to be called "Colwinstūn", possibly from an old English name "Colwine" linked with "tūn", meaning farm or settlement.

=== Norman rule and new land ownership ===
Caradog ap Gruffudd and Iestyn ap Gwrgant from the north and west usurped the princes in about 1070, and Robert Fitzhamon led the Norman invasion of the area from Bristol, probably by sea. Local folklore says that the nickname of "Golden Mile" (the area shown on old maps as being between Twmpath Farm and the main village, or the northern edge of the village's original common) arises either from Fitzhamon's forces lining up to receive their payment along a section of the A48 adjacent to Colwinston, or from Civil War troops gathering in the same location for payment; another theory is that the name originated because of yellow gorse plants growing along the old road at this point.

William de Londres was granted the lordship of Ogmore (which included Colwinston) by Fitzhamon, and also established Ewenny Priory in 1141 under the Benedictine Abbey in Gloucester. He gave 'the Church of St Michael of Ewenny, the Church of St Bridget with the Chapel of Ugemore de Lanfey, the Church of St. Michael of Colvestone with the lands, meadows and all other things belonging unto them’ to the Abbey. The grant of a 66-acre farm (possibly Ty Maen Farm) was later added to this. There is evidence that St Michael and All Angels Church, Colwinston, was founded in 1111, predating the Priory by 30 years.

=== Middle Ages and after ===
By 1340, Sir Roger de Bavant had become the owner of the remainder of the Manor. In 1344 (for reasons unknown) he gave his property to the then King of England, Edward III, who (again for reasons unknown) endowed the property upon the Dominican Nuns at Dartford Priory in Kent. Tithes and rents were paid to the two Priories, with the right to appoint the Vicar being with Ewenny Priory. Henry VIII famously seized all monastery lands in 1536, Sir Edward Carne, a commissioner during the Dissolution of the Monasteries, was able to lease Ewenny Priory from the king, eventually purchasing it in 1545 for £727-6s-4d. He also purchased the Dartford priory land at Colwinston creating a single 'Manor of Colwinston'. By 1539 English law had been extended to cover Wales and the County of Glamorgan was formally established as an administrative unit. Colwinston remained a pocket of recusancy, with priests continuing to administer the sacrament according to the Roman rite. Even into the 17th century, John Lloyd, a local priest under the protection of the Turbevilles at Penlline, was arrested and hanged, drawn and quartered on the Heath at Cardiff in 1679 at the height of the hysteria caused by the 'Popish Plot'.

=== 16th to 19th century ===
The Norman tradition of primogeniture had taken over in Glamorgan, in contrast with traditional Welsh law. In the 1670s, with no sons to inherit, the Carne family lands were divided between two surviving Carne daughters upon their marriages. Colwinston thus became the property of Sir Edward Mansel, 4th Baronet, of Margam when he married Martha Carne.

In 1747 Bussy Mansel, 4th Baron Mansel, succeeded to the title. Having no male heirs, he sold the ‘Manor of Colwinston’ to David Thomas ‘of Bath’. Thomas had married into the family that owned Pwllywrach, where he built a new ‘Manor house’. Four generations later the Manor was again without a male heir after the death of Hubert de Burgh Thomas. His sister, Mary Anna Thomas, married Charles John Prichard some time after 1878, placing the land at Colwinston in trust for their son, Hubert Cecil Prichard.

Small farms were often then sold on to other farmers and landowners in this period. The Golden Mile Common, an area of approximately 70 acres lying alongside the A48, was ‘enclosed’ by an Act of Parliament called the ‘Golden Mile Award’ in 1871. The village population in the 19th century thus became formed around the Pwllywrach House and Hilton Farm, a number of small farm units stretching west–east from Ty Maen to the Yew Tree and Chapel Farms, north to Claypit and Highfield Farms and south to Stembridge and Parcau Farms, some labourers’ cottages owned by the Pwllywrach estate and others, the Church and the Parsonage (and the then Vicarage) and three chapels. Some of the land on the northern side of village was owned by Jesus College, Oxford. Agriculture was supported by other trades including the Sycamore Tree Inn (recorded under that name back to at least 1840, the building is post-medieval), a forge and blacksmith, baker, shoemaker, post office and horse breaker.

However, there was a substantial turnover in the village population following the start of the Industrial Revolution. Census records show that of the 268 people living in the village in 1861, only 98 had been living in the village in 1851; 168 people who died or moved away during that decade were replaced by a high number of births and people moving in from West Wales and Ireland.

The 1861 census also reveals the existence of a private school within the village. A "National" school, supported by the (then) Church of England, was established in 1871, in the building now known as Ty Colwyn, with 27 children on the original register. From 1875 the school was funded through a voluntary Parish rate. The present village school (Church in Wales) was built in 2021 for 210 pupils, replacing a previous set of buildings erected on the site in 1970.

In addition to the Anglican church, several Nonconformist chapels existed in the village, and were popular with Welsh-language speakers. Seion Calvinistic Methodist (Presbyterian) Chapel was built in 1830, surviving until 1996. Ebenezer Baptist Chapel was founded in 1843 and a building established in 1852, using part of Chapel Farm House. It continued in use until 1944, and a baptismal pool was created by blocking off a stream in the field below and to the rear of the chapel.

In 1865, a village branch of the Philanthropic Order of True Ivorites was established, based at the Sycamore Tree Inn, conducting its business in Welsh. This provided a vehicle for villagers with independent incomes to save, and then possibly to buy, their own properties. It finally closed in 1960, and the order as a whole disbanded in the early 1970s.

The 1811 A Topographical Dictionary of The Dominion of Wales by Nicholas Carlisle said of the village:

COLWINSTON, or, TRE COLLWYN, in the Cwmwd of Maenor Glynn Ogwr, Cantref of Cron Nedd (now called the Hundred of Ogmore), County of GLAMORGAN, South Wales: a discharged Vicarage, valued in the King's Books at £6 6s.8d.; Patron, David Thomas, Esq.: Church dedicated to St. Michael. The Resident Population of this Parish, in 1801, was 235. The Money raised by the Parish Rates, in 1803, was £101 6s.10d., at 1s. 6d. per acre. It is 4 m. W. N. W. from Cowbridge. This Parish contains between fourteen and fifteen hundred acres of inclosed Land, and 60 acres of common Pasture, called The Golden Mile. According to the Diocesan Report, in 1809, the yearly value of this Benefice, arising from Vicarial Tythes, and Augmentation, was £111 18s.0d.

=== 20th century ===
The population of the village began to grow away from its agricultural origins, with some emigration to the South Wales coalfields by those seeking industrial employment, whilst the need for intensive labour on farms was reduced by machinery and the village population declined. Some of the original houses fell into disrepair as these population movements took place.

Colonel Hubert Cecil Prichard came to live at Pwllywrach after the First World War. His son Hubert de Burgh Prichard famously married Rosalind Hicks, the only daughter of Agatha Christie, their son Mathew Prichard being given the proceeds from the royalties of The Mousetrap. He subsequently used the substantial sums from the play to establish the Colwinston Charitable Trust in 1995.

Gradually ‘modern’ features eventually found their way to the village, including mains water in 1935, and electricity and telephone (in the form of a public kiosk) from 1946 onwards. A new water main was laid from the A48 in 1972 and a new sewage scheme laid in 1973. A cul-de-sac named Beech Park was built in the 1960s with other small developments following. The smaller, mostly tenanted, farms became unviable in the latter part of the 20th century. The remaining farm buildings between Church Farm and Colwinston House (built originally as a dower house for Pwllywrach) were gradually sold as residential houses, with the barns and rickyards between the farmhouses also being sold off for development. The Pwllyrwrach estate created a single large farm based at Pwllyrwrach Farm, concentrating on sheep and beef cattle farming (rather than the dairy farming which had previously been predominant.)

=== 21st century ===
The agricultural land in and around the village is now variously owned by the Pwllywrach Estate, a number of independent landowners (especially to the north and west of the village) as well as a small number of independent farmers who have bought and/or inherited land over the centuries. Other properties are owned by the Vale of Glamorgan Council for the school, the Village Hall and the remaining social housing. Finally, most private housing is now owned by individual house owners, either as new-build properties or older houses mostly purchased from the Pwllywrach estate, the local authority, the chapel organisations and the Church in Wales or local farmers.

The main fabric of the village was thus set until 2016 when the developer Redrow plc built 64 new homes on land now known as Heol Cae Pwll (completed in 2018), increasing the population to over 600. Protests against the extent of the development by local residents were overruled by the Vale of Glamorgan Council. Community representatives pointed to regular flooding and said that "adding 64 homes to a village with 130 at the moment can only increase that risk". Along with this came "fibre" broadband. The village has gained a local and national reputation in recent years for its community spirit and activities.

== Village on maps and its name ==
A 16th-century map (probably of lands then inherited by the Duchy of Lancaster) shows the village as Colwyns' Tone. The name was sometimes shortened to Coulston (e.g. Christopher Saxton's map of 1578). The village name was later usually spelled as one word, most commonly as Colwinstone or Colwinston. The Ordnance Survey has used ‘Colwinston’ since 1833 (reflecting the usual pronunciation) but some official sources (e.g. census records, official postal addresses) included an -e until the latter part of the 20th century.

The Welsh name of the village, Tregolwyn, first appears in writing c. 1566 as "tref golwyn"; it was not often recorded in official documents because of restrictions on the use of Welsh, but appears to be derived from tun as tref ("town"), and the Welsh name Colwyn or Collwyn, which also has a literal meaning of "cub, whelp, puppy".

== Demographics ==
Colwinston's population was 447, according to the 2011 census; a 10.1% increase since the 406 people noted in 2001. This has recently been increased through the addition of 64 family homes. The 2011 census showed 13.1% of the population could speak Welsh, a rise from 7.8% in 2001.

== Church of St Michael & All Angels ==
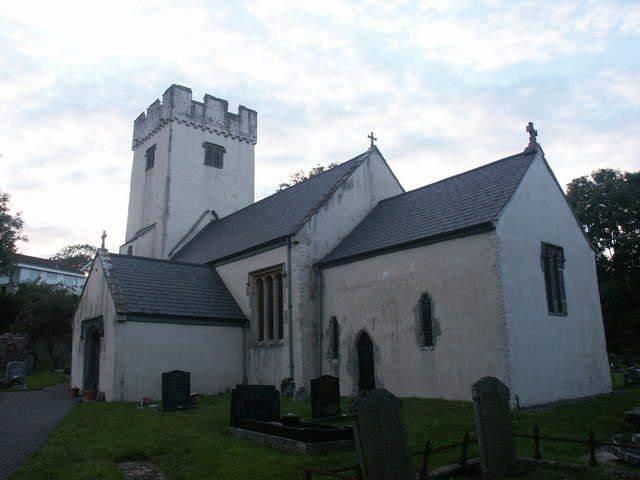
St Michael's Church, Colwinston

The original Norman St Michael's Church in Colwinston is reputed to have been built in 1111. The church was restored in 1879 and again in the 1970s and 2000s.

The medieval parish church is a Grade I listed building. The church underwent a substantial restoration in 1879, and again in 1971 following a fire which badly damaged the chancel, destroying the brass tablets either side of the altar displaying the Ten Commandments. It was at this time that the words “Holy, Holy, Holy” painted in scroll work above the chancel arch were painted over.

Further restoration work at the church was carried out at the millennium with the benefit of a major grant from the Heritage Lottery Fund together with grants from other bodies and funds raised by the villagers. A vestry, kitchen and toilet were built on the north side of the church, the interior and exterior walls were lime washed and the roof repaired at a cost of £350,000.

== Other landmarks ==
Of the ten Grade II listed buildings in the village, all date from the medieval or immediate post-medieval period. These include a thatched house, "The Old Parsonage", the former manor house of Pwllywrach, and several former farmhouses. The Old Parsonage, a thatched house dating to the 16th century at the crossroads and opposite the southeast corner of churchyard, has a Gothic or Tudor arch and the building is "one of only two in Glamorgan with a latrine in the form of a small closet at the side of the fireplace."

In 1835, the Seion Presbyterian Chapel was built but it closed in 1996; it later became a residential building. In 1843, the Ebenezer Baptist Chapel was established and the building was completed in 1852. The last minister was the Rev A.E. Powell of Balarat, who served at the church between 1905 and 1944 before the church became part of a house.

The Sycamore Tree Inn, a public house now owned by Marston's plc, can be dated to 1650 or earlier. In May 1865, The Philanthropic Order of True Ivorites Friendly Society was established and registered there.

Community resources in the village include St David's Church in Wales Primary School, the village hall and the village Playing Field.

== A Thankful Village ==
Colwinston is one of only three villages in Wales which suffered no fatalities in World War I, despite 23 residents of the village having been on active service. It is one of only 53 Thankful Villages in the UK. However, the village lost four men in World War II, one of whom was Agatha Christie's son-in-law, Colonel Hubert Prichard. Welcome signs at the entrance to the village reflected its status as a thankful village from but the village had no war memorial until 2014, when one was erected on the village green. The village is featured on Darren Hayman's album, Thankful Villages Volume 2.

== Governance ==
Colwinston has its own community council with seven elected or co-opted members. For elections to the Vale of Glamorgan Council, Colwinston is part of the Llandow county electoral ward.

== Culture ==
The major social event of the year is the annual village fete, usually held during the first or second week in July. Other annual events include a pantomime and the New Year's Day sport of "collyball". A multi-use games area (MUGA) was constructed close to the village hall in 2013.

The village published its own local source book, Colwinston - A Changing Village, simultaneously with the publication of a fully researched history of the village, Colwinston: A Historical Journey, by Cowbridge History Society.
