= Ewenny Priory House =

Mansion in Ewenny, Wales

Coordinates: 51°29′18″N 3°34′04″W

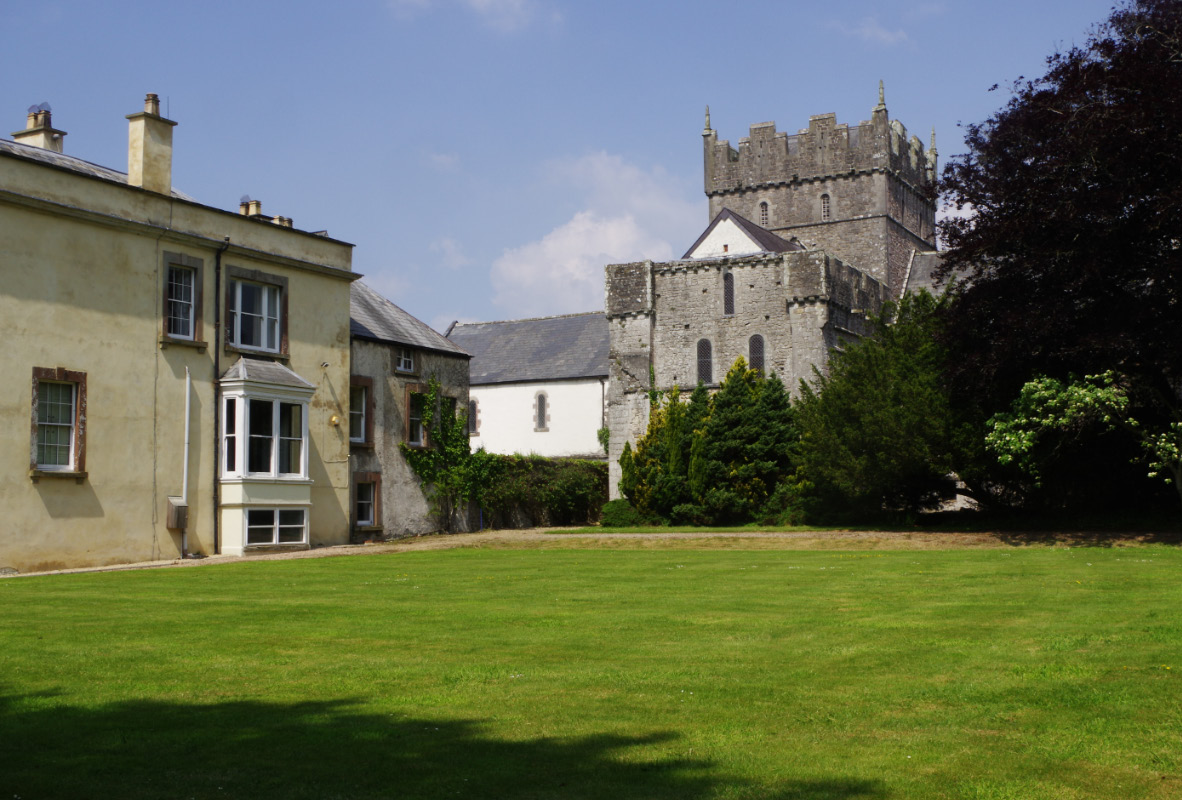
Northeast corner of house and the Priory church

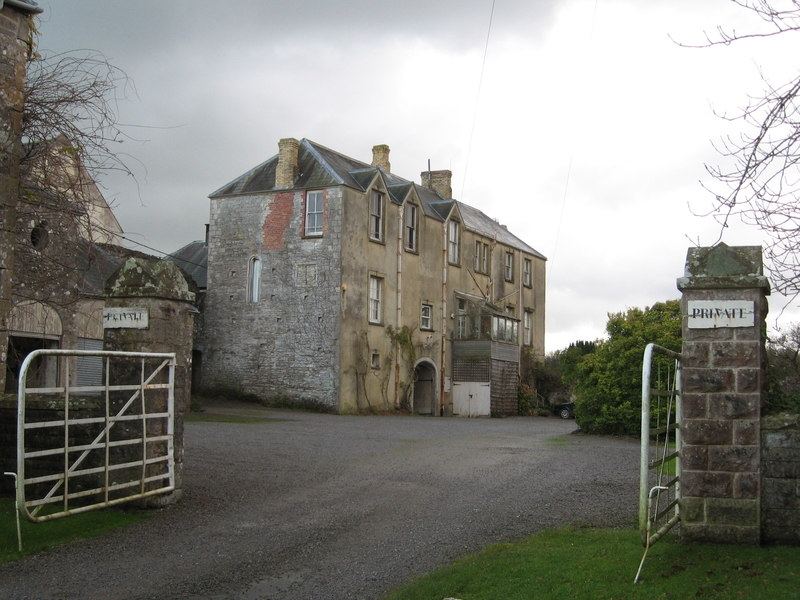
Entrance gate and west wing

Ewenny Priory House is a privately owned Georgian mansion located immediately to the south of Ewenny Priory church, at Ewenny, Vale of Glamorgan, Wales. Originally built in 1545 it was rebuilt in the early 1800s. The house is Grade II* listed.

== History and description ==
The original house was built after 1545 by Sir Edward Carne, who had purchased the Ewenny Priory buildings after it had been dissolved by King Henry VIII. The two-storey Tudor mansion had fallen into disrepair by the 1780s.

Between 1803 and 1805 a new house was built on the site of the south wing of its Tudor predecessor, with two storeys over a basement, five horizontal bays with a central projecting entrance porch reached by a flight of stone steps. Well known London architect John Nash is put forward as the possible designer. The west wing of the Tudor house was retained and, with other buildings, forms a courtyard to the rear of the main house. An arch leads through the wing. A third storey was added to the west wing in the 1890s.

The interior of the main house is well preserved retaining its original features - ornate plasterwork, fireplaces, door frames, and a cantilevered stone staircase in the main entrance hallway.

The mansion became a Grade II* listed building in 1963 for its "great historic interest of its origins, and for its particularly fine well-preserved interior".

The house and grounds are currently used as a wedding venue.
