= The Poster =

Periodical published in London (1898–1900)

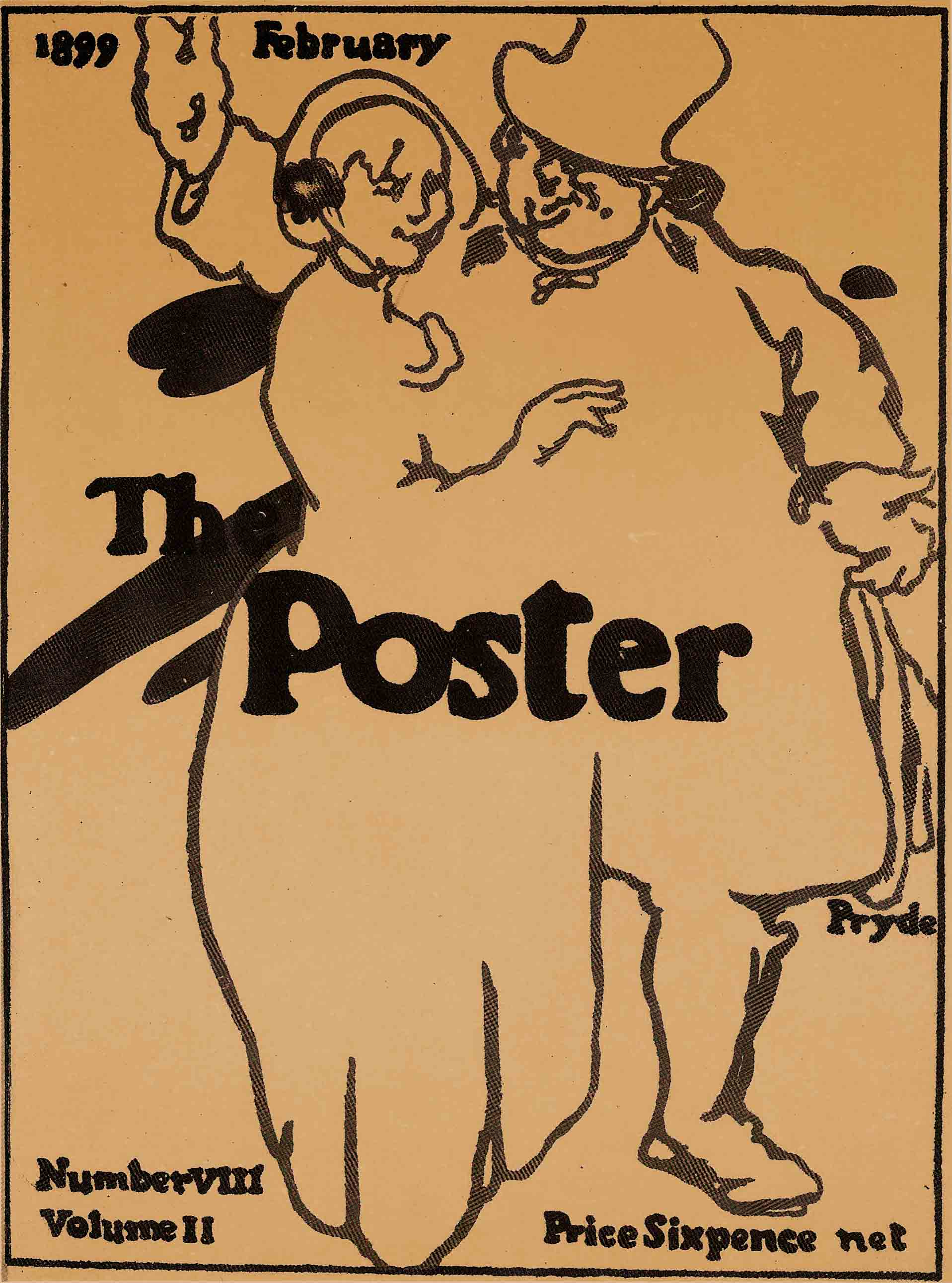
- James Pryde, cover for The Poster, February 1899
- Frequency: Monthly
- First issue: June 1898
- Final issue: December 1900
- Country: United Kingdom
- Based in: London

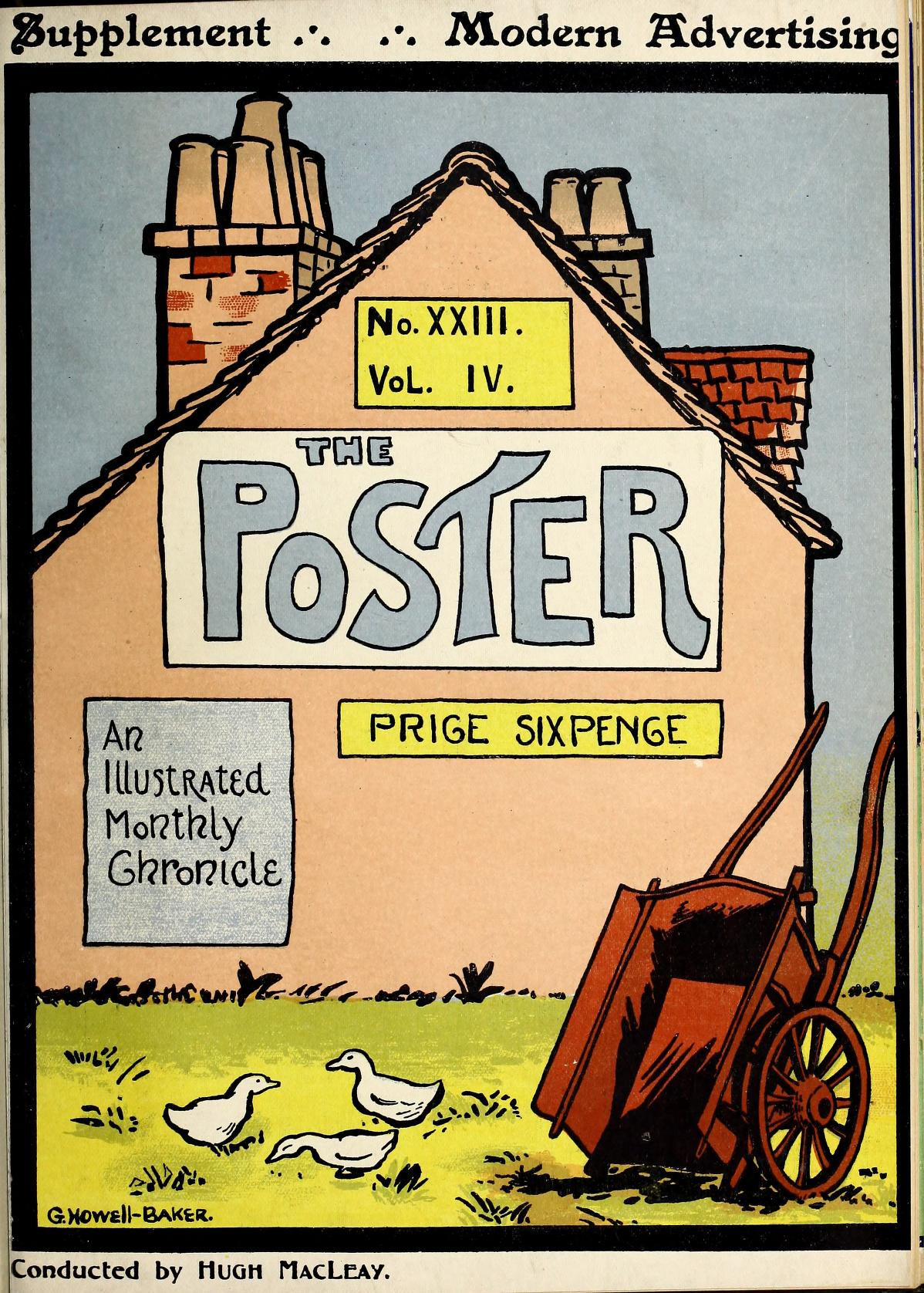
Cover of The Poster, June 1900, by G. Howell-Baker. Baker also wrote an article for this issue.

The Poster: an illustrated monthly chronicle, or simply The Poster, was a monthly magazine published in London from June 1898 to December 1900, dedicated to the then relatively new art of the pictorial poster. It was the first periodical devoted to the poster to be published in Britain. It was published by Ransom, Woestyn & Co.

== Content ==
The Poster contained sections on posters, advertising, and a segment dedicated to collectors and collecting. Illustrations were featured in both black and white and color. It focused on unique poster designs and their creators such as the Beggarstaffs and Toulouse-Lautrec. They were featured multiple times throughout The Poster's runtime along with interviews from designers such as John Hassall and W.S. Rogers.
