= G. Howell-Baker =

British painter

- Born: George Howell Baker; 1871; Prestwich
- Died: 19 September 1919; Bridgend
- Resting place: Nolton and Roch
- Education: Llandudno Collegiate School, Victoria University of Manchester
- Occupations: Painter, illustrator, art educator, poet

George Howell Baker, ARWA (1871-1919), who worked as G. Howell-Baker and under the pseudonym G.H. Rekab, was an Anglo-Welsh artist, illustrator, poet, and art teacher. After early success in London and Paris, he spent the latter part of his life in Bridgend. His work is in a number of major collections, including National Museum Wales and the Royal Collection.

== Early life ==
Barker was born in the first quarter of 1871 in Prestwich Park, (Note: Various sources, mostly modern, and obituaries, give other dates for his birth or death, or different age at death, or place his birth at Marple. The facts in this article have been verified against official registers and census returns.) then in Lancashire, to Mary Catherine (née Howell), from Bridgend and George Baker, from Manchester. He was baptised at Prestwich Park on 15 March 1871. He was not a healthy child and his parents feared he would not reach adulthood. His initial education was by a private tutor at home (in both the 1881 and 1891 censuses, he is recorded with his family at Stone Lodge, Marple), after which he spent the final five years of his schooling at Llandudno Collegiate School. He subsequently studied at Owen's College (later Victoria University), Manchester, where he excelled in biology and zoology.

His birth name was George Howell Baker, in which "Howell" was a given name, but professionally he styled himself as "G. Howell-Baker", with a double-barrelled surname. The original form was given in the census returns for 1901 and 1911, the latter completed by his mother.

== Career ==
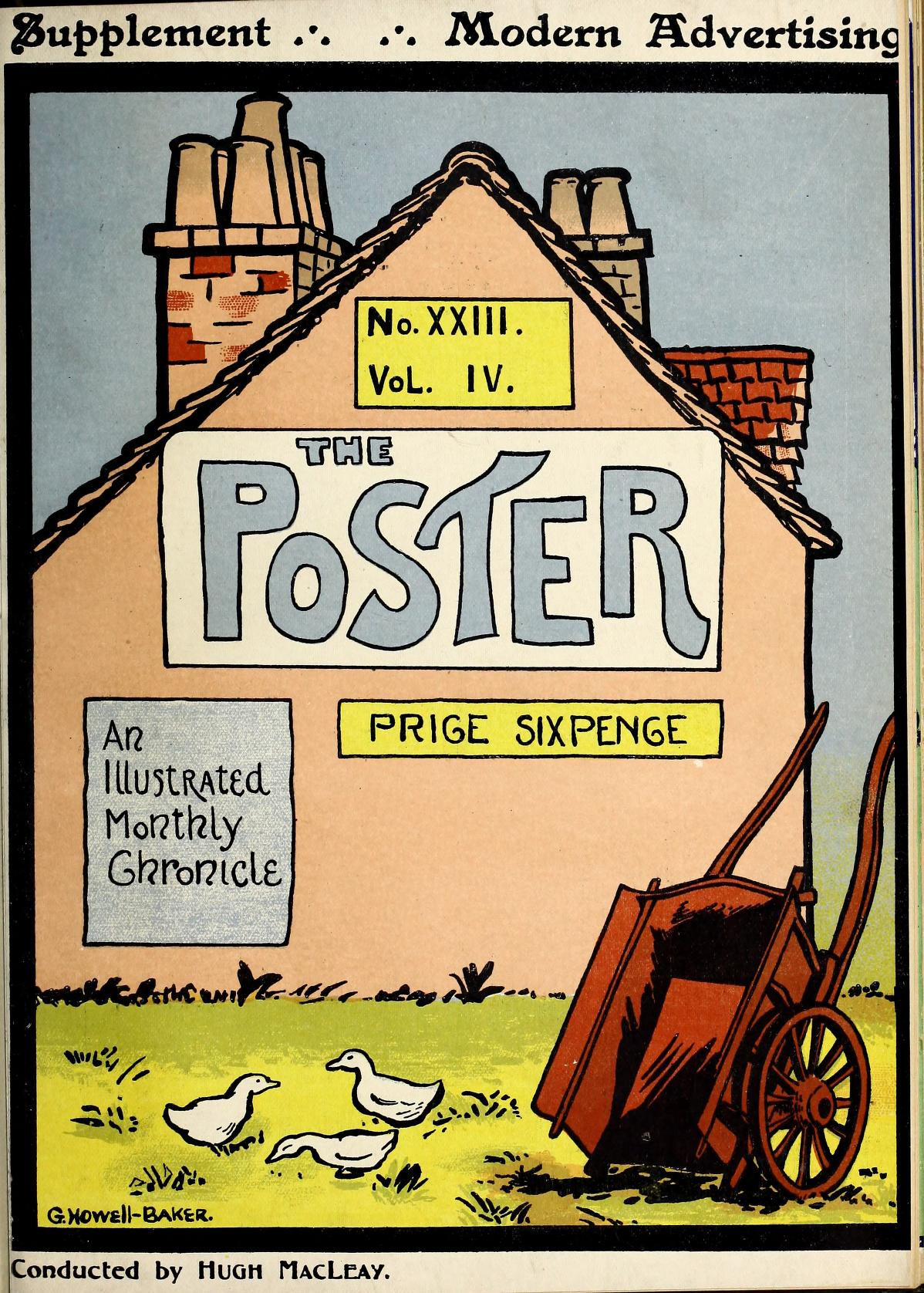
Cover of The Poster, June 1900. Baker also wrote an article for this issue.

As an artist, Baker exhibited at the Paris Salon, and the "Section de Gravures du Salon Artistes Français", as well as a number of galleries in London and across Wales. His oil painting, In Memoriam: Llanmihangel Church was accepted for exhibition by the Royal Academy.

He enjoyed the patronage of Robert Windsor-Clive, 1st Earl of Plymouth, to whom he dedicated two works, and of the artist Sir Ernest Waterlow, R.A.

As an illustrator, he produced sketches and covers for The Poster, for whom he also wrote. He illustrated poems by Tennyson for Vanity Fair.

In 1901, Penholm, (Note: Penholm was royal quarto format (10 by 12.5 inches (250 by 320 mm)) and sold for 10s. 6d. (£0.52½; equivalent to £54 in 2025)) a book of 25 of his drawings reproduced as lithographs on hand-made paper, was published by R. Brimley Johnson. Other than their titles, also listed in an illustrated index, it included no text. One of the drawings, A Cloud to Starboard, was reproduced as a full page in a 1902 edition of The Magazine of Art, to accompany a review of the book. Another, St. George and the Dragon, was reproduced in The Bookman, whose reviewer described Howell-Baker as "a discovery, an artist of real distinction. His work is strong and striking".

He contributed to the short-lived (1901-1903) magazine Western Counties Graphic, using the pen name "Rekab" ("Baker", written backwards). He used the pen name "G.H. Rekab" for his poems, a number of which were published in The Glamorgan Gazette. Under his own name, he wrote a hymn, "S.S. Bremen", (Note: Possibly related to when SS Bremen sailed through the site of the Titanic sinking five days after the event. Although the Bremen didn't stop, this was traumatic for the passengers who saw the numerous corpses in the water, including "one woman in a nightdress with a baby clasped closely to her breast".) with music by E. Edgar Evans.

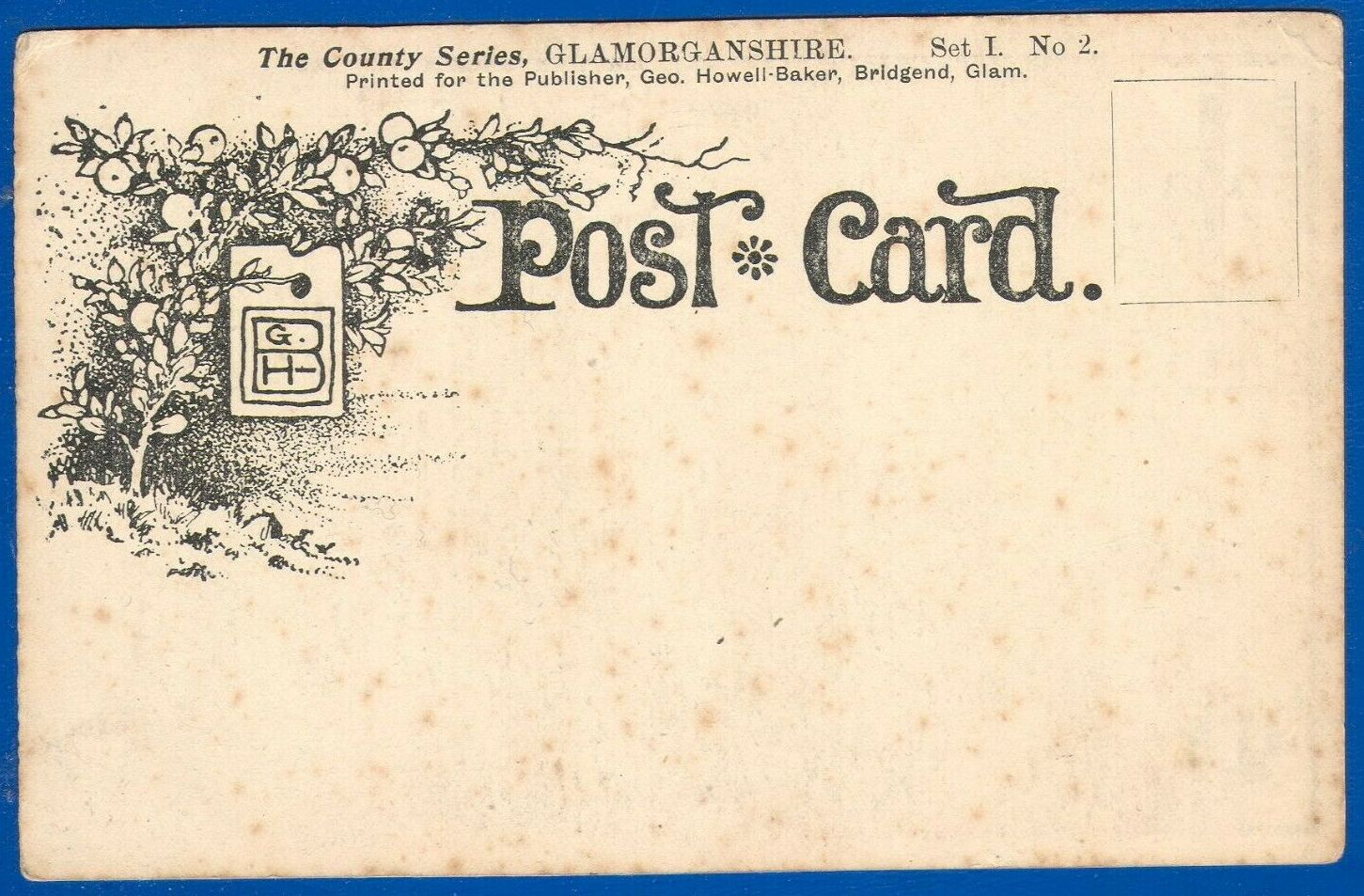
Back of one of Baker's postcards - note monogram, and hyphenated surname

He designed and published a short series of postcards of views local to Bridgend. He also worked as a wood carver.

In May 1914, he exhibited a number of oil portraits (of Miss Dorothy M. Taylor, Gorphwysfa, Penart; Dr W. Edmund Thomas, Ashfield, Bridgend; Miss Dollie Allen, Llwyn Celyn, Bridgend; and Mr A. Taylor, Inspector of Schools), plus other works in oil and watercolour "at Cardiff in connection with the South Wales Art Society".

Baker also taught art and gave public lectures on related subjects for a number of schools and colleges across South Wales.

Baker was a member of the North British Academy and became an Associate of the Royal West of England Academy in 1910.

== Personal life ==
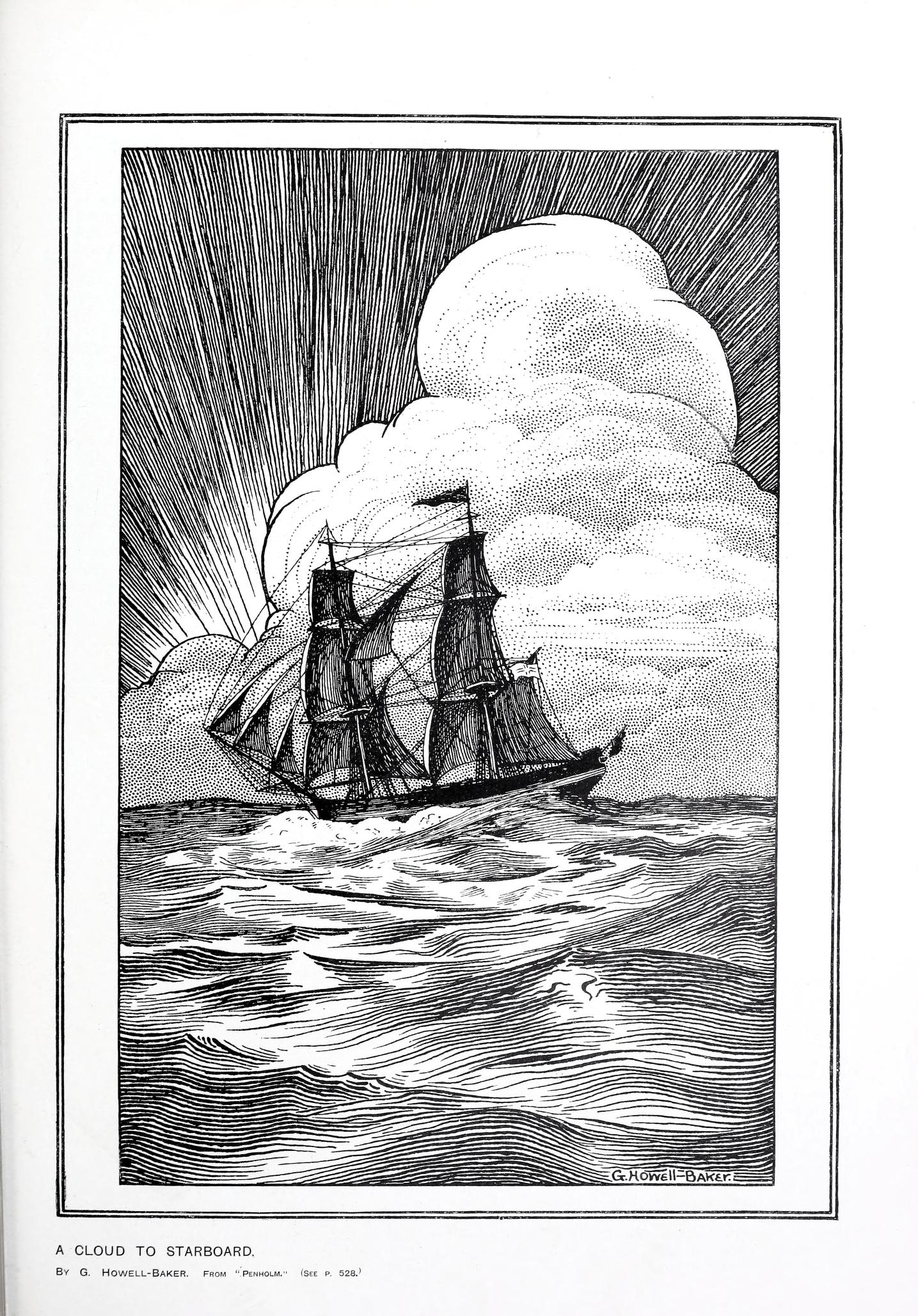
A Cloud to Starboard, from Penholm, as reproduced in The Magazine of Art.

In 1904 Baker was witness to a case of manslaughter which occurred outside his home, at 1, Coychurch Road, Bridgend, and gave evidence at the subsequent inquest. In 1906, he gave evidence at another inquest—into the accidental death of his father, who died after being struck by a horse-drawn wagon.

In 1902, his address was given as "Coychurch-road, Bridgend".

Baker was also a banjo player, and gave occasional public performances.

== Death ==
Around 1917, Baker suffered a "serious nervous breakdown", and two years later died at his home, Ingleside, Bridgend, on 19 September 1919. He was aged 48, and was survived by his widowed mother, his (younger) sister, Mary Catherine Helen ("Nellie"), also an artist and teacher, and a fiancee, Miss Lillie Abbott. Two other siblings predeceased him. He is buried in the churchyard at St Madoc's, Nolton, the funeral having taken place there on 23 September.

At the time of his death "he had intended going to London to publish his eight pen and ink works, each containing several hundred pages; to arrange for an exhibition of his oil and water colour works, and also to be proposed a member of the Etching Association." He was also working on two paintings, one of which was The Boat of Souls. (Note: The source gives the second painting as The Heavenly Parrot; but the clipping in the Cincinnati scrapbook has been manually amended to Heavenly Pallate. A pallate (or pallet) is a basic type of bed, as might be used by low-class people or servants. Another possible interpretation is "palette".)

Obituaries were published in Welsh newspapers and as far away as the United States.

== Legacy ==
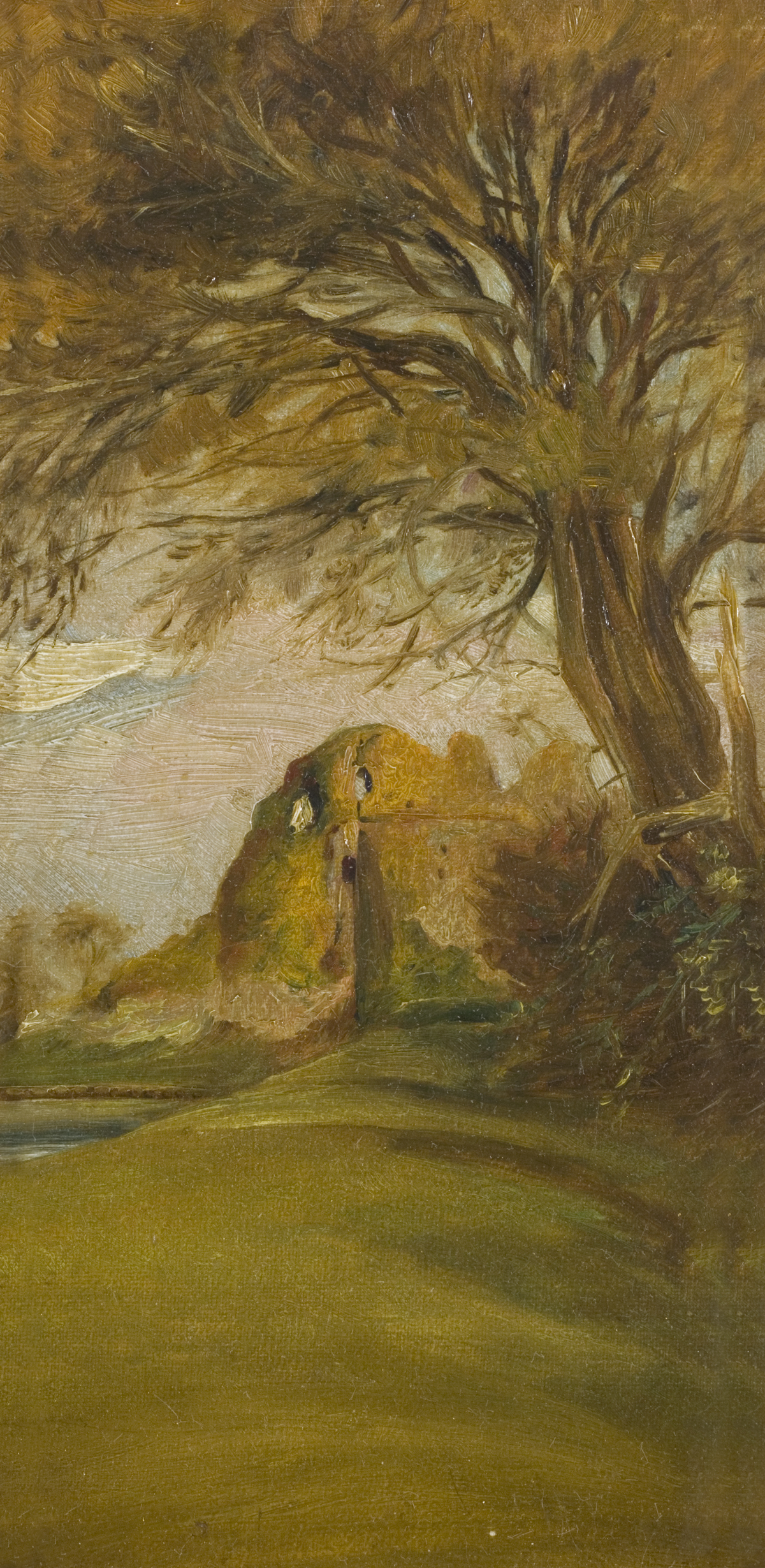
Ewenny Castle (actually depicting Ewenny Priory)

In 1968, a former pupil wrote a newspaper column reminiscing about being taught by Baker. He described him as having:

a black moustache and closely cropped bristling hair... dressed like George Bernard Shaw with a Homberg, Norfolk coat, knicker-bocker trousers, with the tops of his hose turned down below the knee.

His oil painting Ewenny Castle (actually depicting Ewenny Priory) is in the collection of the National Museum Wales, at National Museum Cardiff. NMW also has several works on paper. Another work in oil, Joan of Arc, was in the church of St Agnes in Rouen. Three of his prints are in the permanent collection of the Royal West of England Academy. Eleven works (eight prints; two drawings, 'Tree Study - Symbolical' and 'Peace'; and a watercolour, 'Carrick Fergus Castle') are in the Glynn Vivian Art Gallery in Swansea.

Two miniature pen-and-ink drawings, A Crusader and A Spanish Galleon, provided by his sister after Baker's death, are in Queen Mary's Dolls' House, part of the Royal Collection.

Lillie Abbott moved to Cincinnati after his death, to live with relatives, and a collection of his drawings formerly in her possession, compiled as a scrapbook and annotated by T. A. Langstroth and titled "Victor of Destiny, or, The life of G. Howell-Baker" is held by Cincinnati Library. The scrapbook includes a signed print with a personal inscription by Baker. Langstroth, writing in 1958, notes:

I love the work of G. Howell-Baker not only for his master-hand, but because he is absolutely unknown—a nobody. In the scant forty years since his death, he has been completely forgotten—erased from the face of the earth. There isn't as much as one line or word about him in the Cincinnati Public Library nor in the New York Public Library, for that matter. A letter sent to London, England, verified the fact that they also have forgotten him.

It is apparent that it was his destiny to be erased from the face of the earth. As a child, he was very sickly and his life was despaired of before he was ten years old.

== Notes ==
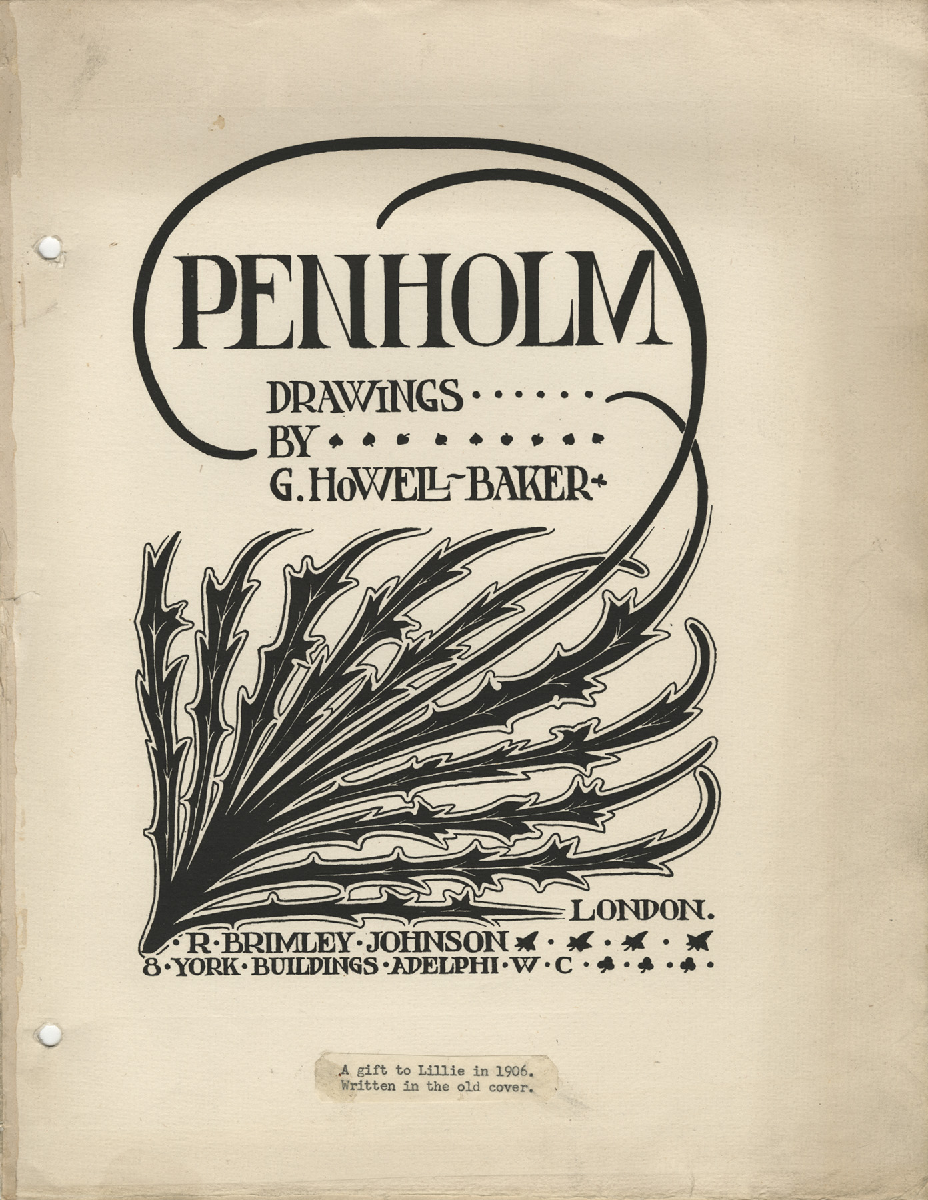
Cover of Penholm
