= Pwllywrach =

Manor house in the Vale of Glamorgan, Wales

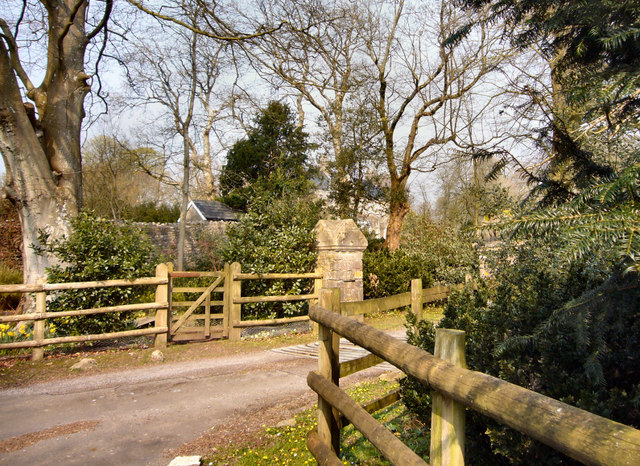
- Entrance to Pwllywrach

- Location within Vale of Glamorgan

General information
- Location: Near Colwinston, Vale of Glamorgan, Wales
- Coordinates: 51°28′3″N 3°30′33″W

Pwll-y-Wrach or Pwllywrach is a historic manor house to the east of Colwinston, Vale of Glamorgan, south Wales. The house and its Western garden house and Eastern garden house are all listed as Grade II listed buildings in their own right. The gardens themselves are designated Grade II on the Cadw/ICOMOS Register of Parks and Gardens of Special Historic Interest in Wales. The novelist Agatha Christie was a frequent visitor to the village and stayed at the house with her daughter Rosalind, son-in-law Hubert Prichard, and her only grandchild Mathew; her descendants, the Prichard family, still live at the former manor.

When Bussy Mansel, 4th Baron Mansel, sold the estate to David Thomas "of Bath", the latter built a new manor house, completed around 1770, which would be altered and extended in the 19th and 20th centuries.

The walls are built of rubble with a cement facing and the roof is of Welsh slate. The porch, added in the 19th century, is constructed of Forest of Dean sandstone ashlar. At the same time as the porch was built, the entrance hall was remodelled to accommodate it.

Points of architectural interest are the fireplace and main staircase in the entrance hall. A "lamb and flag" crest can be seen on the façade of the house.
