= Hubert Prichard =

English cricketer

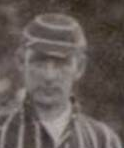

Personal information
- Born: 5 February 1865; Bristol, England
- Died: 12 November 1942 (aged 77); Glamorgan, Wales
- Batting: Right-handed
- Relatives: Rosalind Hicks (daughter-in-law); Mathew Prichard (grandson)

Domestic team information
- Years: Team
- 1896: Gloucestershire
- Source: Cricinfo, 30 March 2014

Colonel Hubert Cecil Prichard CBE (5 February 1865 – 12 November 1942) was an English cricketer. He was born in Stapleton, Gloucestershire, and played two matches for Gloucestershire in 1896. He later played for Glamorgan. He left the army in 1897 and relocated to Colwinston in Wales, where he resided at Pwllywrach. During the Second World War, he was a major in the Glamorgan Yeomanry and commandant of a prisoner-of-war camp.

He was the son of Charles John Collins Prichard (1830–1903) and Mary Ann Thomas (1840–1898). Prichard married Nora Diana Piers (11 December 1879 – 19 December 1979) in 1905. They had three children:

- Lydia Diana Williams (née Prichard; 17 April 1906 – 15 October 1982). She married Elydr Gwyn Williams (20 October 1905 — 8 November 1980).
- Major Hubert de Burr Prichard (14 May 1907 – 16 August 1944). He married Rosalind Hicks, only child of the author Agatha Christie, in 1940. His son, Mathew Prichard, was born in 1943. Hubert was killed in the war next year.
- Lt.-Col. David Matthew Caradoc Prichard (8 June 1912 – 1 June 1986). He married Elizabeth Aileen Maud Llewellyn (9 October 1914 – 14 April 2011), daughter of Sir David Richard Llewellyn, 1st Baronet, and Magdalene Anne Harries, on 25 June 1946. They had three sons: Robert David Caradoc Prichard (17 November 1947 – 1995), Colin Hubert Llewellyn Prichard (born 19 August 1949), William de Burgh Prichard (born 31 March 1953).
