= Edward Carne =

Welsh Renaissance scholar (c.1500–1561)

Sir Edward Carne (c. 1500 – 19 January 1561) was a Welsh Renaissance scholar, diplomat and English Member of Parliament.

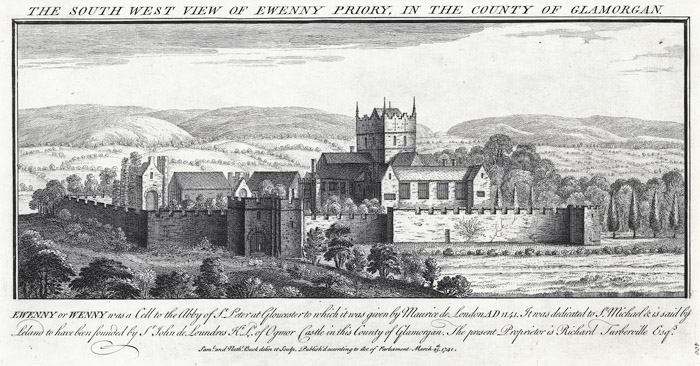
Ewenny Priory, residence of Sir Edward Carne

== Life history ==
Carne was born around 1500, the second son of Howell Carne of Cowbridge in Glamorgan, and his wife Cicily, the daughter of William Kemys. Carne was descended from Thomas Le Carne, who was the second son of Ithyn, King of Gwent. He was educated at Oxford University, and became principal of Greek Hall. He was made Doctor of Civil Law in 1524.

His wife was Anne, a daughter of Sir Edward Mansel of Margam. He had one legitimate son, William, and four daughters.

Carne became known as an erudite and eloquent speaker and became attached to the court of Henry VIII. In 1530 he was selected in a legal capacity to represent the embassy of the Earl of Wiltshire, Anne Boleyn's father.

Carne profited from the Dissolution of the Monasteries in Glamorgan, where he purchased Ewenny Priory, building a house there after 1545. In 1539 he obtained the lease of Gaunt's Hospital, Bristol, and acted as its treasurer. He was due to go abroad to arrange the ill-fated marriage of Anne of Cleves to King Henry VIII, and the revenue from the foundation was directed in the meantime to the support of his wife, Anne Denys, a daughter of Sir William Denys (d.1535) of Dyrham, Glos. Bristol Corporation objected, and in 1540 the church was purchased by Bristol Corporation.

He was appointed High Sheriff of Glamorgan for 1543 and 1554, Master of Requests from 1540 to 1554 and was elected knight of the shire (MP) for Glamorgan in 1554.

During Queen Mary's reign he served on embassies to Emperor Charles V and to Rome, where he chose to remain on the accession of Elizabeth I and was put in charge of the English hospital of St. Thomas in the city. He is buried in the narthex of the Church of St. Gregory on the Caelian Hill in Rome.

Parliament of England
Preceded by	Member of Parliament for Glamorganshire; 1554–1555	Succeeded by
