= Ewenny Priory =

Former monastery in Wales

- Priordy Ewenni (Welsh)
- Ewenni Priory
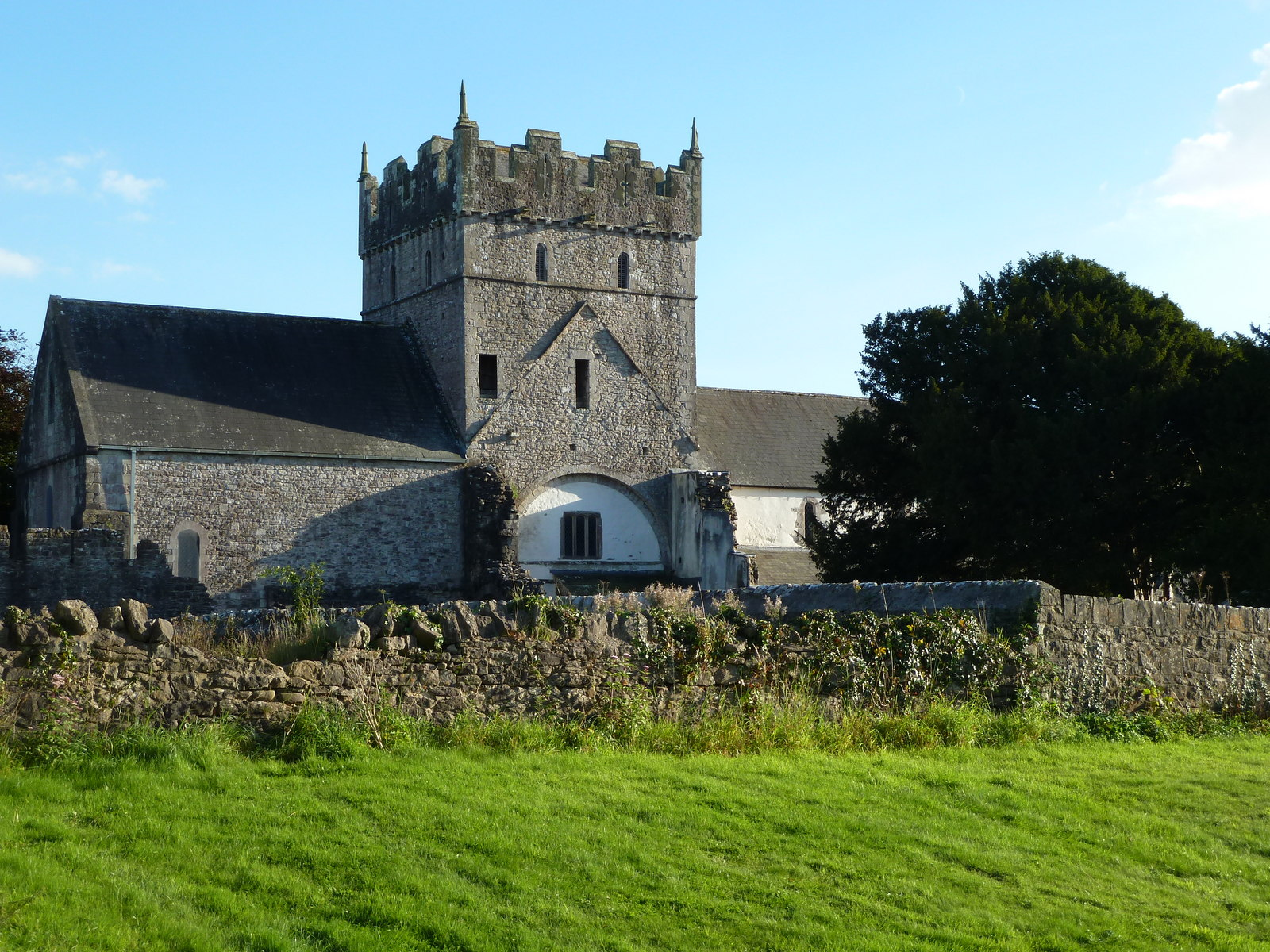
- "The most complete and impressive Norman ecclesiastical building in Glamorgan"

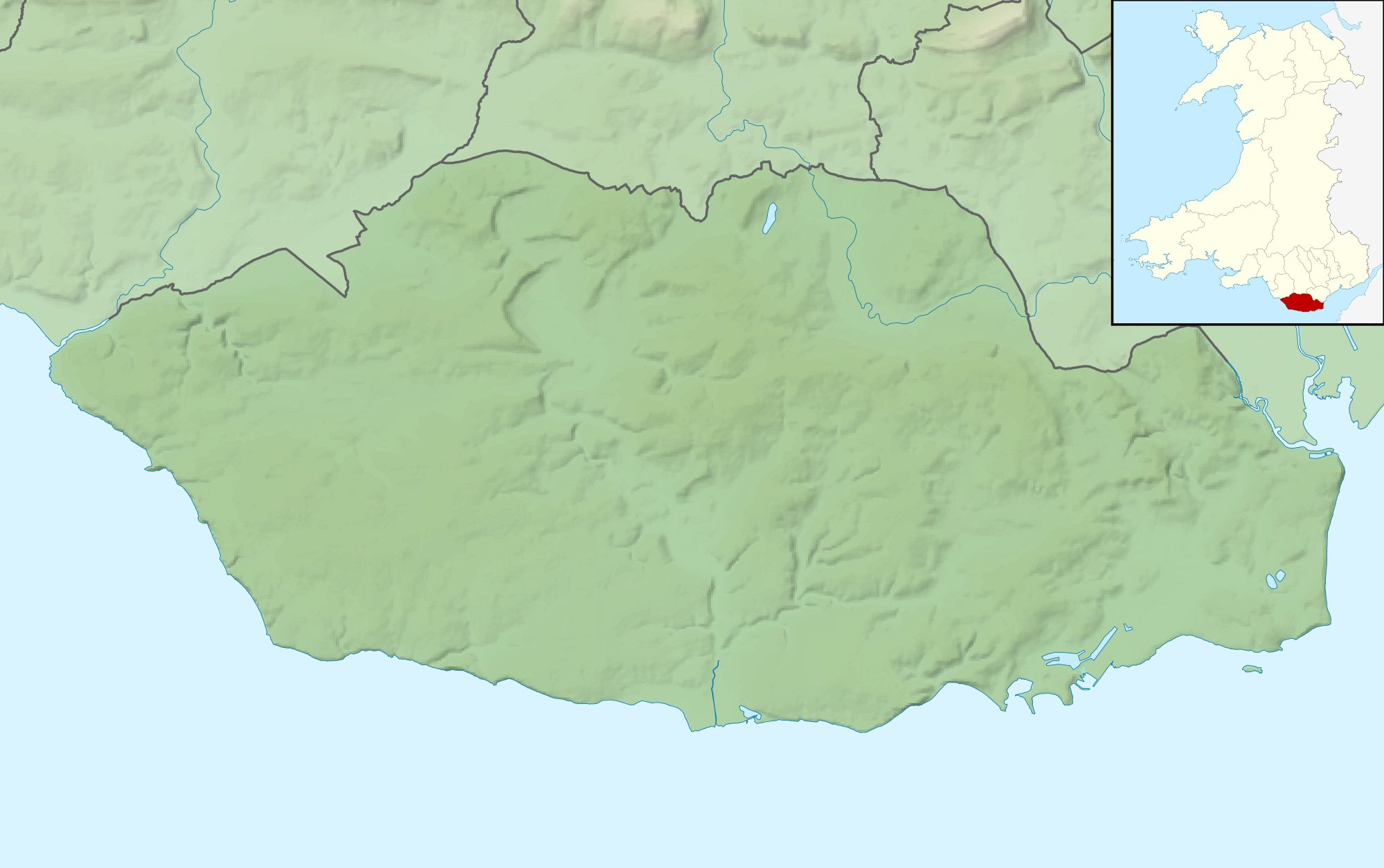
- Location within Vale of Glamorgan
- 51.4888°N 3.5676°W
- Type: Priory
- Location: Ewenny, Vale of Glamorgan

Site notes
- Architectural style: Romanesque
- Website: Ewenny Priory; Ewenni Priory (Cadw)

Listed Building – Grade I
- Official name: Ewenny Priory Church
- Designated: 26 July 1963
- Reference no.: 11250

Listed Building – Grade I
- Official name: Church of St Michael
- Designated: 26 July 1963
- Reference no.: 11251

Listed Building – Grade I
- Official name: North Tower and attached stretch of precinct wall at Ewenny Priory (house)
- Designated: 3 March 1998
- Reference no.: 19470

Listed Building – Grade I
- Official name: North Gatehouse at Ewenny Priory (house)
- Designated: 3 March 1998
- Reference no.: 19462

Listed Building – Grade I
- Official name: South Gatehouse at Ewenny Priory (house)
- Designated: 3 March 1998
- Reference no.: 19471

Ewenny Priory (Welsh: Priordy Ewenni), in Ewenny in the Vale of Glamorgan, Wales, was a monastery of the Benedictine order, founded in the 12th century. The priory was unusual in having extensive military-style defences and in its state of preservation; the architectural historian John Newman described it as "the most complete and impressive Norman ecclesiastical building in Glamorgan". Following the dissolution of the monasteries, parts of the priory were converted into a private house by Sir Edward Carne, a lawyer and diplomat. This Elizabethan house was demolished between 1803 and 1805 and replaced by a Georgian mansion, Ewenny Priory House. The house is still owned by the Turbervill family, descendants of Sir Edward. The priory is not open to the public apart from the Church of St Michael, the western part of the priory building, which continues to serve as the parish church (Church in Wales) for the village. The priory is in the care of Cadw and is a Grade I listed building.

== History ==
The priory was founded by Maurice de Londres in 1141. Maurice granted the Norman church of St. Michael to the abbey of St. Peter at Gloucester, now Gloucester Cathedral, together with the church of St Brides Major and the chapel at Ogmore "in order that a convent of monks might be formed". (Note: Maurice de Londres' tomb is located in the priory church at Ewenny.) The church had been built in the 12th century by his father, William de Londres, one of the Norman knights of Glamorgan.

There had been an older, monastic cell on the site, of the Celtic church. It is described in the 12th century Book of Llandaff as dedicated to Eguenni, an early Welsh saint. De Londres plundered the site with the intent of building a castle on it but was stopped by a decree from Pope Honorius II dated 12 April 1128 which threatened De Londres with excommunication.

The priory was dissolved in 1536 by which time its complement of monks totalled only three. It was leased in the same year to Sir Edward Carne. Carne was a lawyer and diplomat, and held a number of positions at the courts of Henry VIII and of his successors. (Note: Sir Edward Carne ultimately fell out with Elizabeth I and declined to return to England from his diplomatic posting in Rome, for fear that his Catholicism would lead to the forfeiture of his estates. He died in the city in 1560 and is buried in the Church of St Andrew and St Gregory.) In 1545 he purchased the priory, along with its possessions and began the construction of Ewenny Priory House, incorporating many of the priory structures. The Carnes also established two deer parks on the estate, one for fallow and one for red deer. The estate descended in the Carne family to Edward Carne (died 1650) who was succeeded by his two daughters and co-heirs, Blanche and Martha. Blanche (died 1685) inherited Ewenny, and married her cousin Colonel Sir John Carne (died 1682), of Corntown. Their son Richard Carne (c.1669-1713) was succeeded by his two sisters and co-heirs, Frances (died 1714), the wife of Edward Turbervill of Sutton, and Jane (died 1741). Edward and Frances Turbervill were succeeded by their son Richard Turbervill, who became the sole owner of the Ewenny estate on the death of his aunt in 1741.

By the late 18th century, the Carne house was in a state of dereliction; John Byng the diarist described it as a "miserable mansion" following a visit in 1787. In 1803-1805 the Elizabethan house was demolished and a new Georgian building constructed by Richard Turbervill Picton. He was succeeded by his son Richard Turvervill Turbervill (died 1848), who was succeeded in turn by his brother Colonel Gervase Powell Turberville, who died childless c.1862. The estate then passed to his great-nephew Lieutenant-Colonel Thomas Picton-Warlow (died 1892), who changed his name to Thomas Picton-Turbervill in 1867 and from him passed down in the Picton-Turbervill family for several generations.

J. M. W. Turner painted the priory during his third tour of Wales in 1795.

The priory church and much of the complex is now in the care of Cadw. Ewenny Priory House and its gardens remain a private residence of the Picton-Turbervill family who also operate the house as a wedding venue. St Michael's Church continues to serve as the parish church for the village. The church underwent reconstruction in the early 21st century, including the installation of a glass screen designed by Alexander Beleschenko which divided it from the unused eastern part of the building. Since 2024, Cadw, who take care of the site, use the Welsh spelling Ewenni, in "Ewenni Priory", as part of an effort to standardise the names in both languages.

== Architecture and description ==
The priory site is broadly rectangular and stands on the southern bank of the Ewenny River. The priory church stands to the east, with walls to the east, north and west. The site was originally fully enclosed but the southern range was destroyed during the construction of Ewenny Priory House in the very early 19th century. The walls are pierced by two gatehouses to the north and south and three towers to the north, west and east. The priory site is generally in a good state of preservation; aside from the building of the house from 1803 to 1805, and a "conservative restoration" undertaken by Thomas Picton Turbervill between 1869 and 1886, it has seen little development. John Newman, in his 1995 edition, Glamorgan of the Pevsner Buildings of Wales series, describes the priory church as the "most complete and impressive Norman ecclesiastical building in Glamorgan".

The scale of the defensive works built around a minor priory has puzzled historians. Michael Salter, in his study Castles of Gwent, Glamorgan and Gower, suggests that the extensive defences were primarily for show, citing the absence of any defensive ditch, the weakness of the positioning and the large extent of the complex which would have required a very considerable force to defend. Elisabeth Whittle supports this analysis, describing the complex's defences as "a façade, a show of strength built only to impress", but notes that the scale and solidity of the construction are indeed impressive. Newman also considers the walls were built for display, rather than to "afford serious protection", but is uncertain as to why "such a small and relatively poor community felt it should put on such an expensive show".

The priory church is a notable, and rare, example of Romanesque architecture with rounded arches, barrel vaulting and geometric decoration. The cruciform plan of the church is also typical of the period and style. Simon Jenkins critiques the Beleschenko screen, installed in 2004, as breaking the "spatial integrity of the interior".

=== Listing designations ===
The priory complex has a large number of listed buildings. Those at Grade I include: the eastern and western parts of the priory church; the original West doorcase, now sited in the East wall of the priory enclosure; the North Tower, and the North and South Gatehouses; and the wall standing on the western side of the site. Buildings designated Grade II* include: Ewenny Priory House; a barn; a medieval fish pond; the wall that encloses the eastern side of the precinct; and the former South East Tower. Those structures listed at Grade II include: the North, West, and East ranges of the stable courtyard; the precinct wall to the north-east; a wall running between the northern and southern gatehouses; and a gateway and wall which forms part of the 19th-century remodelling of the grounds.

The priory is also a scheduled monument, as is the Romanesque Gateway, the dovecote, the North and South Gatehouses, the barn, the stables, the precinct walls, and Ewenny Priory House. The grounds are designated Grade II on the Cadw/ICOMOS Register of Parks and Gardens of Special Historic Interest in Wales.

== Gallery ==
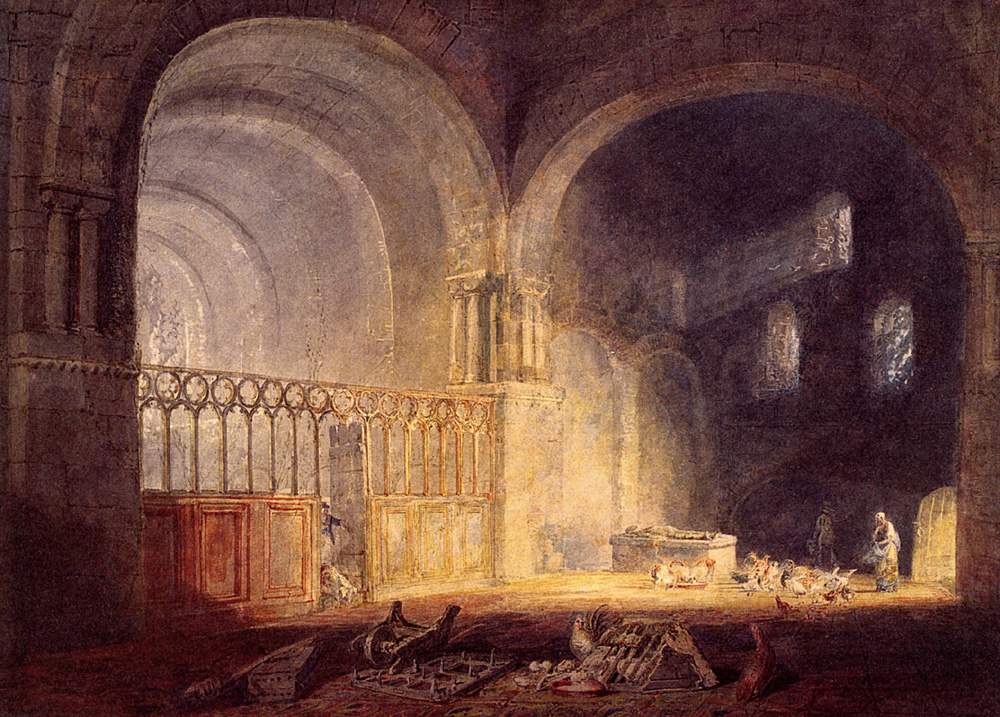
Transept of Ewenny Priory by J. M. W. Turner

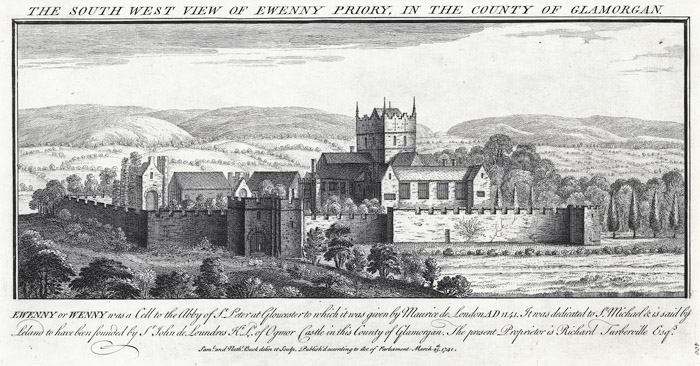
An engraving of the priory complex from 1741

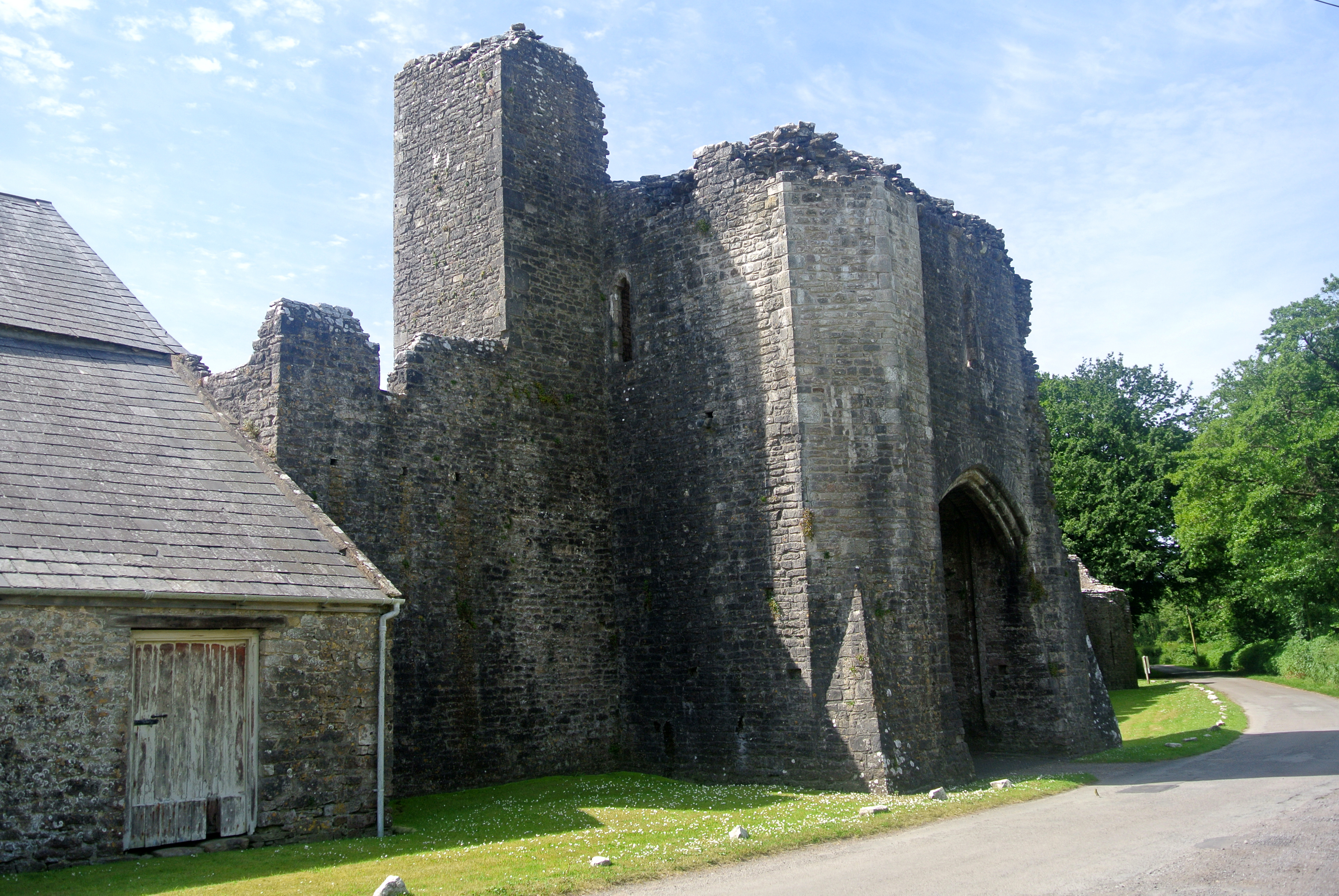
Ewenny Priory exterior

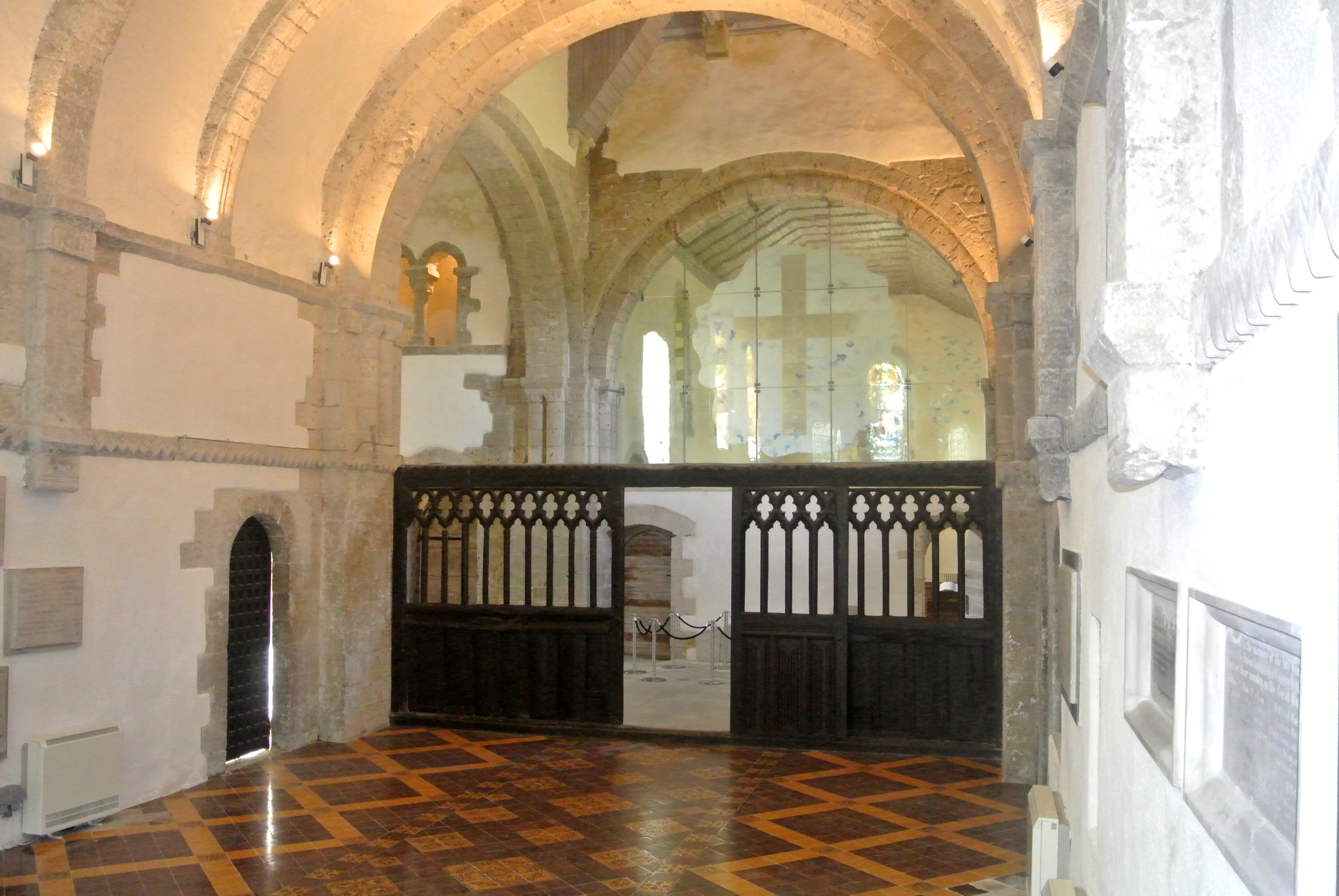
Ewenny Priory interior

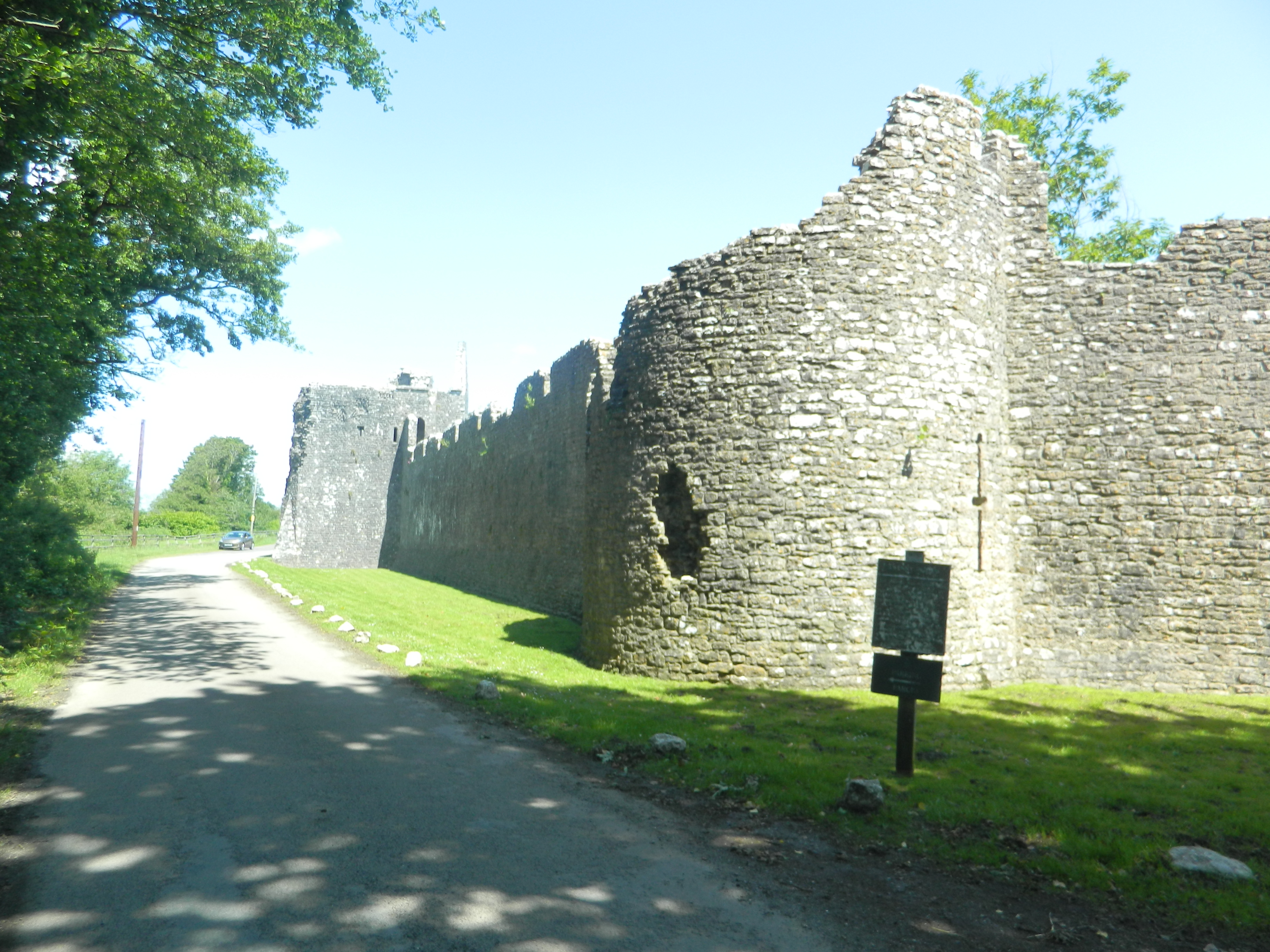
Walls surrounding the priory precinct

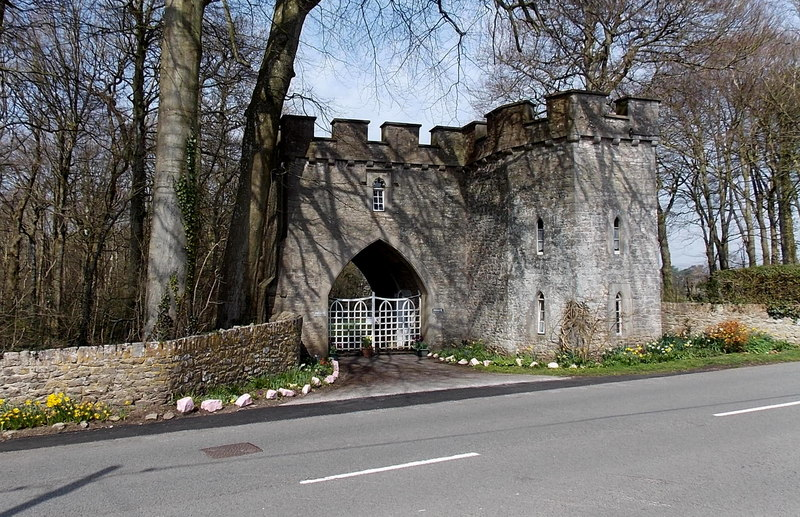
One of the two 19th-century lodges built in emulation of the priory's medieval walls

== Sources ==
- Fox, Cyril (1954). South Wales and Monmouthshire: Illustrated Regional Guide to Ancient Monuments. Vol. 4. London: HMSO. OCLC 1181693161.
- Jenkins, Simon (2008). Wales: Churches, Houses, Castles. London: Penguin Books. ISBN 978-0-713-99893-1.
- Kenyon, John R. (2010). The Medieval Castles of Wales. Cardiff: University of Wales Press. ISBN 978-0-708-32180-5. OCLC 837173639.
- Newman, John (1995). The Buildings of Wales: Glamorgan. London: Penguin Books. ISBN 978-0-140-71056-4.
- Salter, Mike (2002). Castles of Gwent, Glamorgan and Gower. Malvern, UK: Folly Publications. ISBN 978-1-871-73161-3.
- Whittle, Elisabeth (1992a). The Historic Gardens of Wales. Cardiff: CADW. ISBN 978-0-117-01578-4.
- — (1992b). A Guide to Ancient and Historic Wales: Glamorgan and Gwent. London: HMSO. ISBN 978-0-117-01221-9. OCLC 30739843.

== Images ==
- Priory interior
- St. Michael's Church
