= List of places in the Vale of Glamorgan =

Map of places in Vale of Glamorgan compiled from this list
See the list of places in Wales for places in other principal areas.

This is a list of towns and villages in the principal area of Vale of Glamorgan, Wales.

== A ==
- Aberthaw
- Aberthin

== B ==
- Baglan
- Baglan Higher
- Barry
- Barry Island
- Bonvilston
- Boverton
- Broughton

== C ==
- Cadoxton
- City
- Clawdd Coch
- Cogan
- Colwinston
- Corntown
- Cowbridge

== D ==
- Dinas Powys
- Drope,
- Dyffryn

== E ==
- Eglwys Brewis
- Ewenny

== F ==
- Flemingston
- Fontegary

== G ==
- Gileston
- Gwern-y-Steeple
- Graig Penllyn

== H ==
- Hensol Castle

== L ==
- Lavernock
- Llampha
- Llanbethery
- Llanblethian
- Llancadle
- Llancarfan
- Llandough (near Cowbridge)
- Llandough (near Cardiff)
- Llandow
- Llangan
- Llanmaes
- Llanmihangel
- Llansannor
- Llantrithyd
- Llantwit Major
- Llysworney

== M ==
- Marcross
- Michaelston-le-Pit
- Monknash
- Moulton

== O ==
- Ogmore
- Ogmore-by-Sea

== P ==
- Penarth
- Pendoylan
- Penllyn
- Penmark
- Peterston-super-Ely
- Porthkerry

== R ==
- Rhoose

== S ==
- Sigingstone
- Southerndown
- St Andrew's Major
- St Athan
- St Brides Major
- St Donats
- St Hilary
- St Lythans
- St Mary Church
- St Nicholas
- Sully

== T ==
- Talygarn
- Ton Mawr, Oakwood
- Tredodridge
- Treguff
- Treoes

== W ==
- Walterston,
- Welsh St Donats
- Wenvoe
- Wick

== Y ==
- Ystradowen
