= Lidmore =

Coordinates: 51.424419°N 3.306471°W

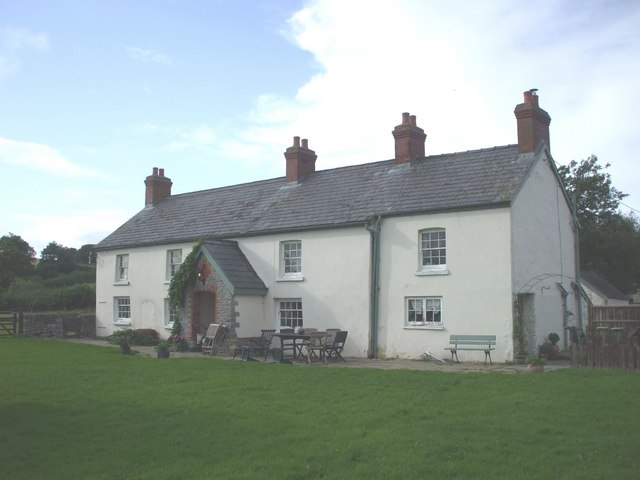
- Lidmore Farm

- Location within the Vale of Glamorgan
- Principal area: Vale of Glamorgan
- Preserved county: South Glamorgan
- Country: Wales
- Sovereign state: United Kingdom
- Post town: BARRY
- Postcode district: CF62
- Police: South Wales
- Fire: South Wales
- Ambulance: Welsh
- UK Parliament: Vale of Glamorgan
- Senedd Cymru – Welsh Parliament: Vale of Glamorgan

Lidmore or Lydmore is a small hamlet and farm in the Vale of Glamorgan. It is located just off the A4226 road, to the northwest of Highlight Park in Barry, Vale of Glamorgan and in close proximity to Brynhill Golf Club. To the north is Great Hamston and Dyffryn and the hamlet is accessed through another hamlet called Northcliff from the main road. To the southwest is Lidmore Wood and the Welsh Hawking Centre.

== Landmarks ==
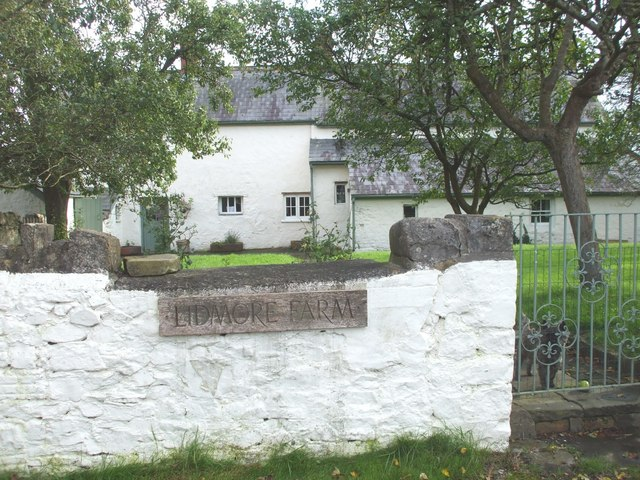
Lidmore Farm gate

The main landmark is the Lidmore Farm, an early 18th-century Grade II listed building. It is a "two-storey, whitewashed rubble stone farmhouse" with a "Welsh slate roof with four corniced brick ridges and end stacks. There are two wings, the narrower downhill and set back at each elevation. The main frontage faces the garden and this has a three-window range of sashes to the left main unit: two to the left (plus one smaller to ground floor) and one to the right of a gabled porch which is of rock-faced stone with brick dressings, including moulded brick cambered arch, flag floor and boarded door." Refurbished in the 19th century, Lidmore Farmhouse became a listed building on 10 October 2002.

Several of the former farm buildings along the lane near the farmhouse which were shown on the Tithe Map of 1842 have been converted into expensive houses, the largest of which is a sprawling stone bungalow. The land to southeast of the farm formerly belonged to Highlight Farm before it was purchased by Brynhill Golf Club in the mid-1990s.
