= Valeways Millennium Heritage Trail =

Heritage trail in Wales

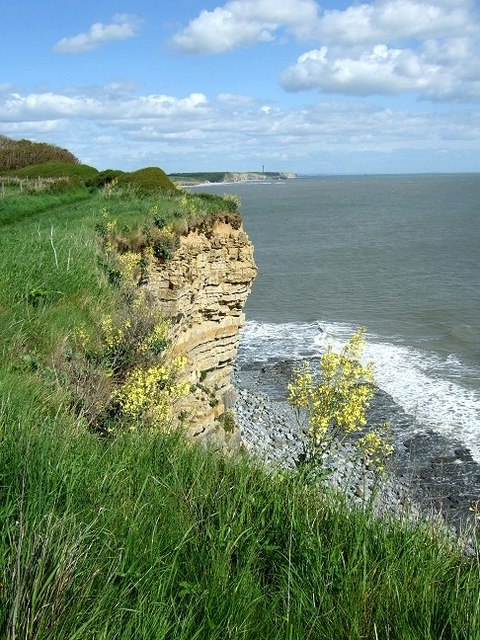
- Coastal scenery on the trail, near St Donats
- Length: 111 km (69 mi)
- Location: Vale of Glamorgan, Wales
- Trailheads: St Fagans; 51.4853°N 3.2694°W; Peterston-super-Ely; 51.4753°N 3.3269°W
- Use: Hiking

The Valeways Millennium Heritage Trail is a waymarked long distance footpath in the Vale of Glamorgan, Wales.

== Distance ==
The route, including spurs, is 111 kilometres (69 mi) long.

== Route ==
The meandering circular route runs through the Vale of Glamorgan by way of Peterston-super-Ely, Barry, Cowbridge, Llantwit Major, St Brides Major and Llanharry, with spurs to Ewenny Priory and St. Fagans.

The terrain is varied and includes coastal paths on the Heritage Coast, pasture land in the Vale, and industrial archaeology sites, as well as prehistoric sites such as Tinkinswood and the St Lythans burial chambers.

The whole route is close to Cardiff.
