= Great Hamston =

Coordinates: 51.431499°N 3.308543°W

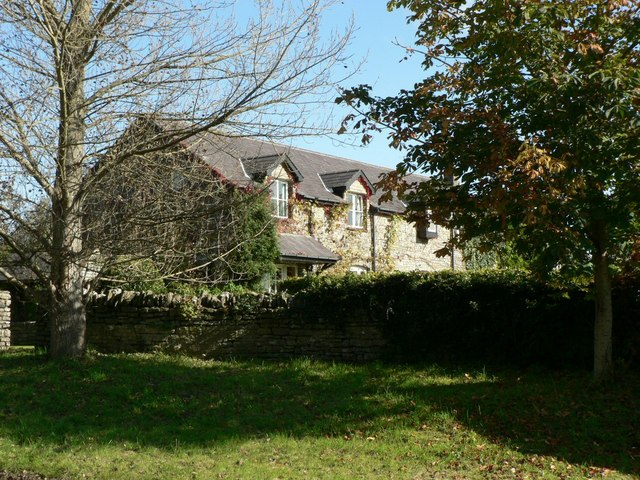
- Great Hamston Farmhouse

- Location within the Vale of Glamorgan
- Principal area: Vale of Glamorgan
- Preserved county: South Glamorgan
- Country: Wales
- Sovereign state: United Kingdom
- Postcode district: CF
- Police: South Wales
- Fire: South Wales
- Ambulance: Welsh
- UK Parliament: Vale of Glamorgan
- Senedd Cymru – Welsh Parliament: Vale of Glamorgan

Great Hamston is a small hamlet and farm in the Vale of Glamorgan in south Wales. It is located about 4.2 miles (6.8 km) north of the town centre of Barry, about 600 metres to the south of the main village of Dyffryn, even nearer to Lower Dyffryn, west along the lane from Goldsland, and just north of Lidmore and North Cliff Farm. It lies off the A4226 road (Five Mile Lane). The River Waycock flows through the hamlet and the Goldsland Brook joins this stream from the east just to the northeast of Great Hamston. The Hamston Pond Cottage is let out to tourists. Just to the north is the Aqua farm, Dyffryn Springs, which is a noted commercial fishing spot for trout in the county and the hamlet also contains an allotment. Great Hamston Farm has a distinctive white tower which can be viewed on Bing Maps Birdseye view. The lane to Goldsland and Wenvoe to the east contains the Old Wallace Farm and the New Wallace Farm.

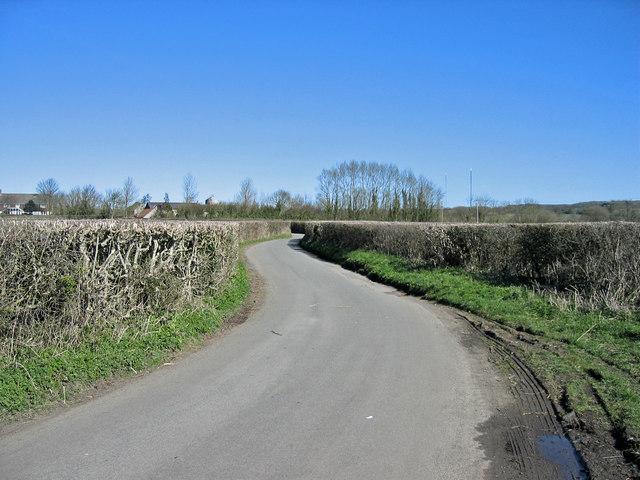
Lane between North Cliff Farm and Great Hamston
