= St Cadoc's Church, Llancarfan =

Church in the Vale of Glamorgan, Wales

Coordinates: 51.42285°N 3.36595°W

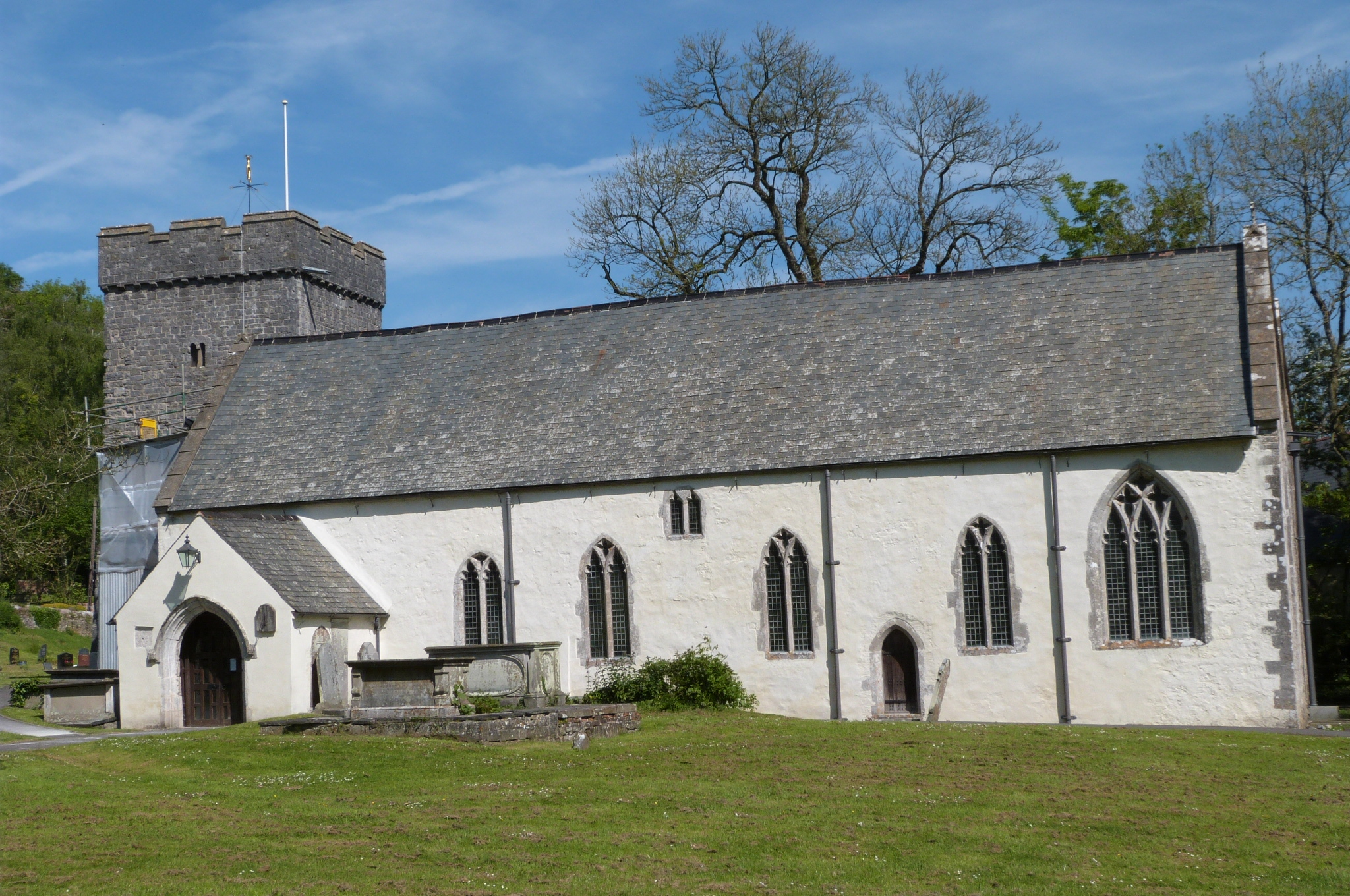
St Cadoc's Church, Llancarfan

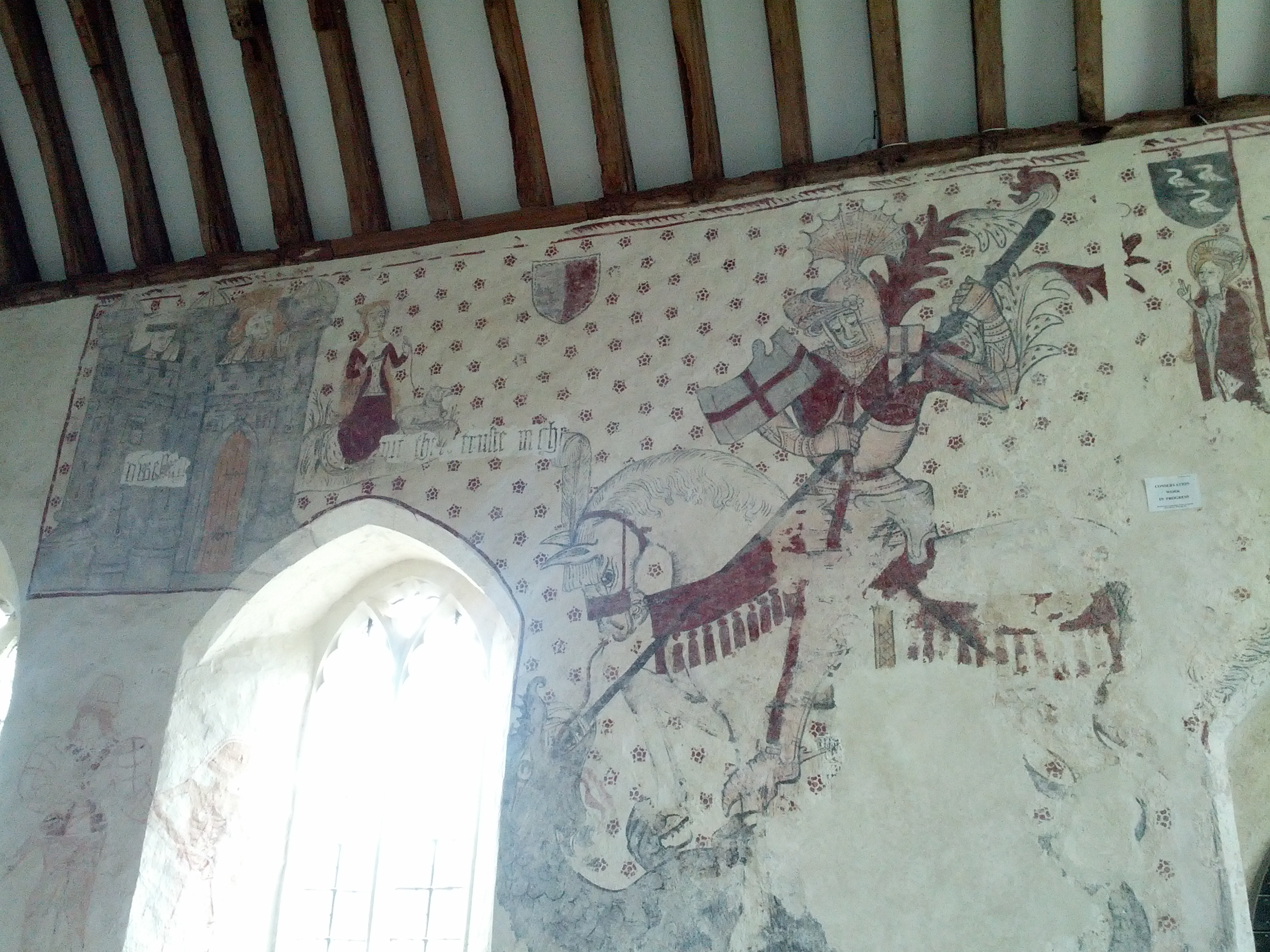
Mural of Saint George and the Dragon

St Cadoc's Church, Llancarfan is a church in Llancarfan, in the Vale of Glamorgan, south Wales. It dates from the 13th century and has been a Grade I listed building since 28 January 1963.

The church is one of several churches in Wales dedicated to St Cadoc, but it was at Llancarfan that the saint is believed to have served as abbot of, or possibly founded, a monastery of some importance. It is claimed that the name "Llancarfan" means "church of the stags" though this explanation is disputed. Other explanations are that the Welsh word 'carfan' meaning a row or a ridge may refer to a boundary or that it is named after a person called Carfan. The church once had a chancel window said to be a masterpiece of stained glass. During the reign of Oliver Cromwell a local man named Whitton Bush destroyed the window by repeatedly beating it while shouting "Down with the Whore of Babylon!"

In 2013 restoration work was carried out on medieval wall paintings discovered at the church in 2008. When layers of limewash were removed, it was found that the topics depicted include the Seven Deadly Sins and Saint George and the Dragon. Further investigations suggested that the paintings are among the best surviving examples in the whole of the UK, and that the depiction of Saint George and the Dragon is the largest on the subject from that period, as well as the most complete. Another painting deals with the unusual topic of "Death and the Gallant". Their date has been estimated at the second half of the 15th century.
