= Twyn-yr-Odyn =

Coordinates: 51.456667°N 3.273889°W

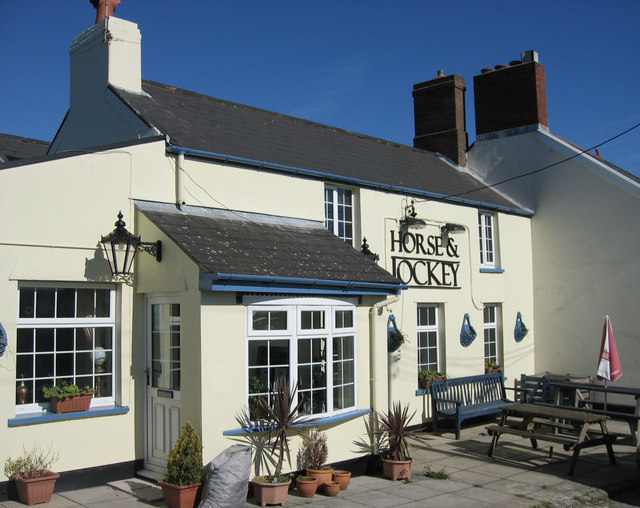
- The Horse and Jockey Inn

- Location within the Vale of Glamorgan
- Principal area: Vale of Glamorgan
- Preserved county: South Glamorgan
- Country: Wales
- Sovereign state: United Kingdom
- Post town: CARDIFF
- Postcode district: CF5
- Police: South Wales
- Fire: South Wales
- Ambulance: Welsh
- UK Parliament: Vale of Glamorgan
- Senedd Cymru – Welsh Parliament: Vale of Glamorgan

Twyn-yr-Odyn (Welsh: Twynyrodyn) is a hamlet in the Vale of Glamorgan, southeast Wales, just beyond the territorial border of western Cardiff. It lies just southwest of Culverhouse Cross, very close to Wenvoe and St Lythans. The Wenvoe Transmitter is located there. It is home to a pub named the Horse and Jockey Inn. There is an allotment in the vicinity.
