= Moulton, Vale of Glamorgan =

Coordinates: 51.422222°N 3.334167°W

Moulton: Welsh: Moltwn
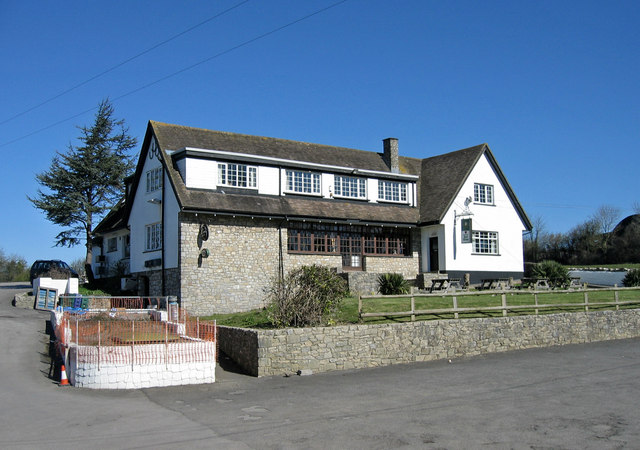
- The Three Horse Shoes Pub, Moulton

- Location within the Vale of Glamorgan
- Community: Llancarfan
- Principal area: Vale of Glamorgan
- Preserved county: South Glamorgan
- Country: Wales
- Sovereign state: United Kingdom
- Post town: Barry
- Postcode district: CF62
- Police: South Wales
- Fire: South Wales
- Ambulance: Welsh
- UK Parliament: Vale of Glamorgan
- Senedd Cymru – Welsh Parliament: Vale of Glamorgan

Moulton (Welsh: Moltwn) is a hamlet in the Vale of Glamorgan, southeastern Wales. It lies off the A4226 road on the road, northwest of Barry and east of Llancarfan. The landmark of note is the Three Horse Shoes pub and restaurant which attracts visitors from all across the Vale of Glamorgan. To the south of Moulton is the small hamlet of Sutton.

There has been evidence of settlement in the area since at least the 4th Century with the discovery in 1956 of Roman ruins in the area dating as far back as the 2nd Century.

The local Ty Uchaf farmhouse could be the oldest inhabited home in the Vale of Glamorgan.
