= Walterston =

Coordinates: 51.431948°N 3.340492°W

Walterston: Welsh: Trewallter
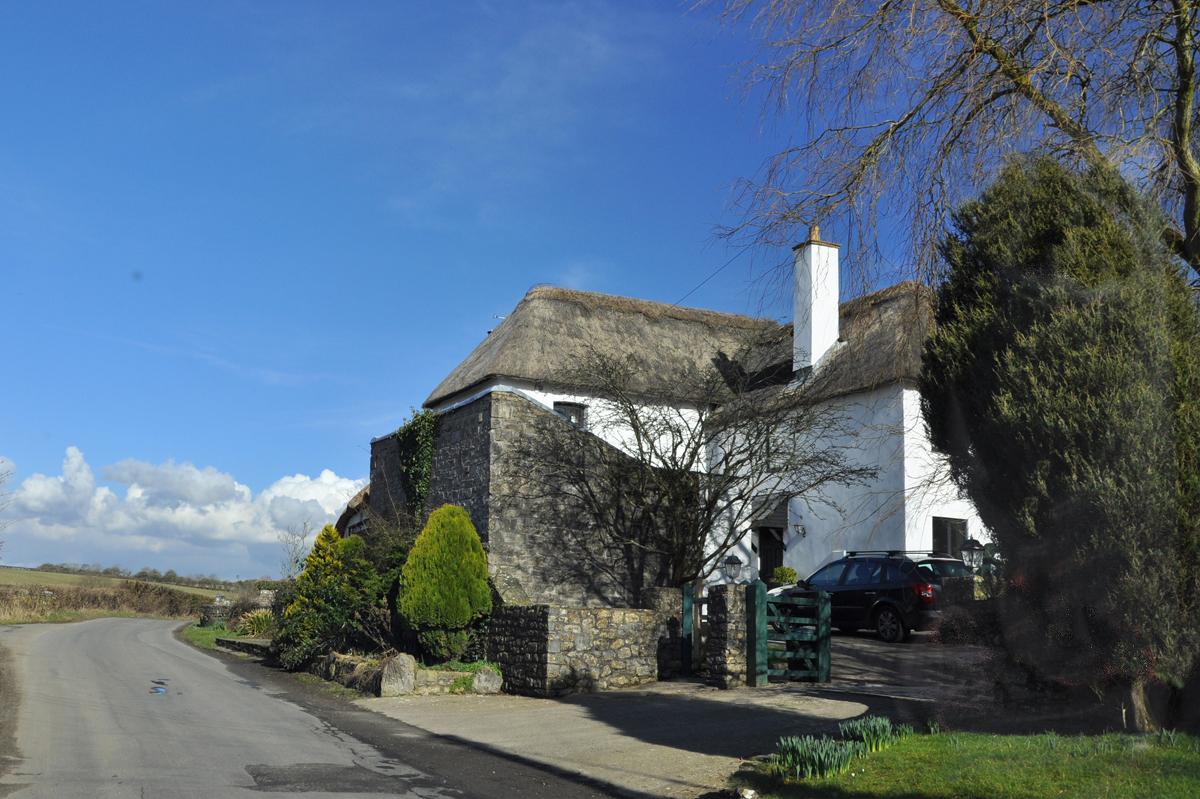

- Location within the Vale of Glamorgan
- Community: Llancarfan
- Principal area: Vale of Glamorgan
- Preserved county: South Glamorgan
- Country: Wales
- Sovereign state: United Kingdom
- Postcode district: CF
- Police: South Wales
- Fire: South Wales
- Ambulance: Welsh
- UK Parliament: Vale of Glamorgan
- Senedd Cymru – Welsh Parliament: Vale of Glamorgan

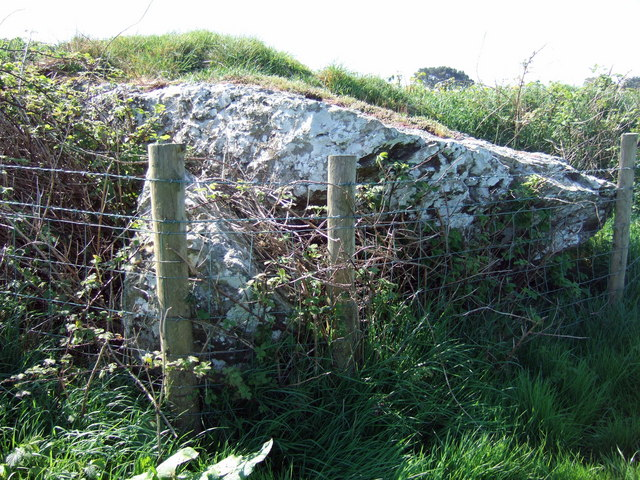
The capstone of the Trewalter burial chamber

Walterston (Welsh: Trewallter) is a small farming hamlet in the community of Llancarfan, just north of Barry in the Vale of Glamorgan in South Wales and west of Dyffryn.

Walterston lies just to west of the Five Mile Lane leading down to Waycock Cross, Barry. The hamlet is very small and has just a few farms, all of which are twelfth to thirteenth century in origin. There are also several houses of which the two largest are the thatched 'Walterston Fach' and its neighbouring 'Trewallter Fawr'. The old monastic village of Llancarfan lies a further two miles to the west.
