= Llanmihangel =

Hamlet in the Vale of Glamorgan, Wales

Coordinates: 51.438164°N 3.46702°W

Llanmihangel: Welsh: Llanfihangel y Bont-faen
- Hamlet
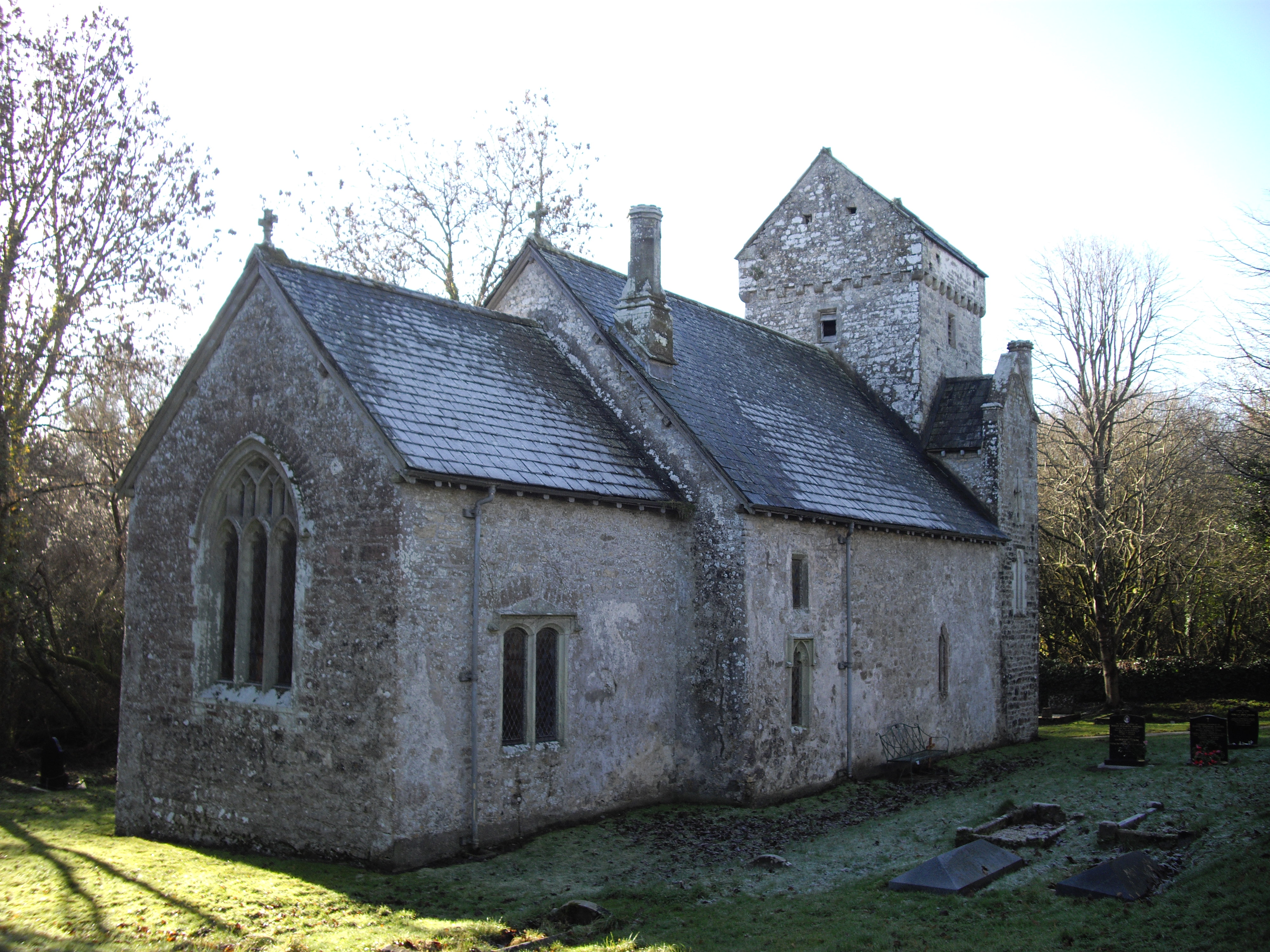
- Saint Michael's Church

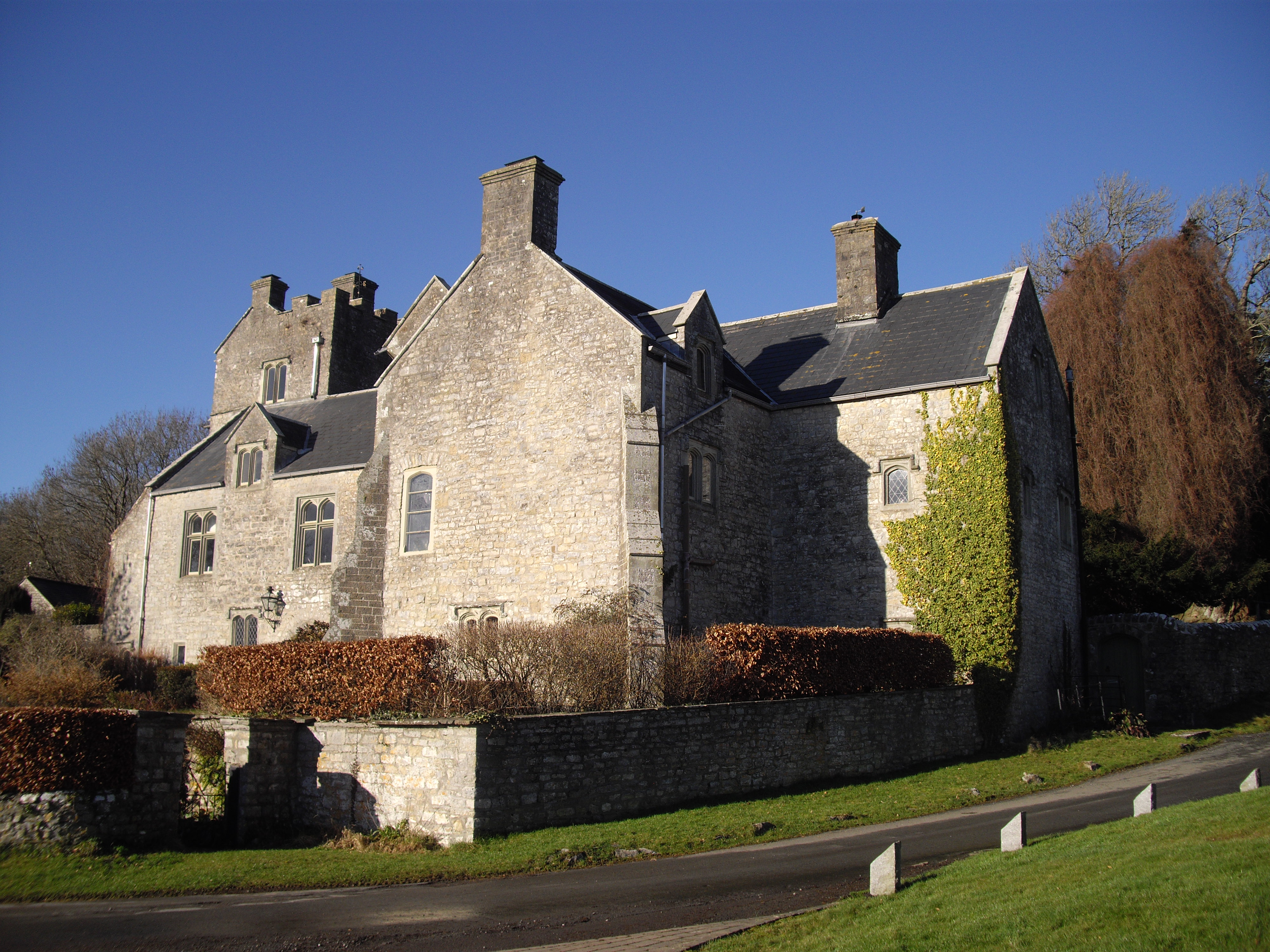
- Plas Llanmihangel

- Location within Wales
- OS grid reference: SS 9815 7192
  - Cardiff: 17.6 mi (28.3 km)
  - London: 164 mi (264 km)
- Civil parish: Parish of St. Michael
- Community: Llandow Community
- Principal area: Vale of Glamorgan Council
- Country: Wales
- Sovereign state: United Kingdom
- Post town: Cowbridge
- Postcode district: CF71
- Dialling code: 01446
- Senedd Cymru – Welsh Parliament: Vale of Glamorgan
- Website: https://www.llandow.org.uk/LCC/

Llanmihangel (Welsh: Llanfihangel y Bont-faen) is a small hamlet in the Vale of Glamorgan. It lies 2.5 miles (4 km) southwest of Cowbridge and between Llandow and Sigingstone.

== Toponymy ==
The Welsh name for the village (Llanfihangel y Bont-Faen) translates to 'Saint Michael's Church of the Bridge Stone'. The English name for the village comes from an unmutated version of the Welsh name Mihangel (Michael in English) and Llan, a Welsh word that translates to a 'church' or the 'area surrounding a church'.

== Historical buildings ==
Plas Llanmihangel is a grade I listed manor house in the centre of the village on Llanmihangel Road. It dates back to the 12th century originally being owned by a Norman knight. In 16th and 17th centuries, the Thomas family took ownership. The last person to own the manor was Sir Robert Thomas, 2nd Baronet.

St Michael's Church is an Anglican church close to Llanmihangel Place. It is led by Reverend C.A Vaughan. The church first appears in records 1254 in a tax registry. The church's dedication to Saint Michael and All Angels suggests an earlier Norman building, but apart from that, there is no evidence of an early Norman community in Llanmihangel.

St. Anne's Well is a small well beside the church dedicated to Saint Anne, but has become so overgrown with plants the original sculpture of Saint Anne is now longer visible. The well predates the church and could have been visited by monks from Llantwit Major or Llancarfan.
