= Llanmaes =

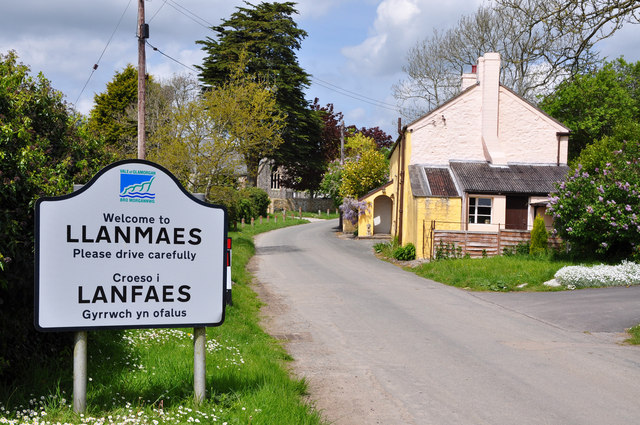
- Entering Llanmaes from the south

- Location within the Vale of Glamorgan
- Population: 403
- OS grid reference: SS981695
  - Cardiff: 15 mi (24 km)
  - London: 144 mi (232 km)
- Community: Llanmaes
- Principal area: Vale of Glamorgan
- Preserved county: South Glamorgan
- Country: Wales
- Sovereign state: United Kingdom
- Post town: LLANTWIT MAJOR
- Postcode district: CF61
- Post town: BARRY
- Postcode district: CF62
- Dialling code: 01446
- Police: South Wales
- Fire: South Wales
- Ambulance: Welsh
- UK Parliament: Vale of Glamorgan
- Senedd Cymru – Welsh Parliament: Vale of Glamorgan
- List of places UK Wales Vale of Glamorgan 51.416667°N 3.466667°W Map of the community

Llanmaes (Welsh: Llanfaes) is a small village and community in the Vale of Glamorgan near the market town of Llantwit Major. The population in 2011 was 403.

== Amenities ==
Llanmaes has a long history, with remains of a Roman fort in fields next to the coast road.

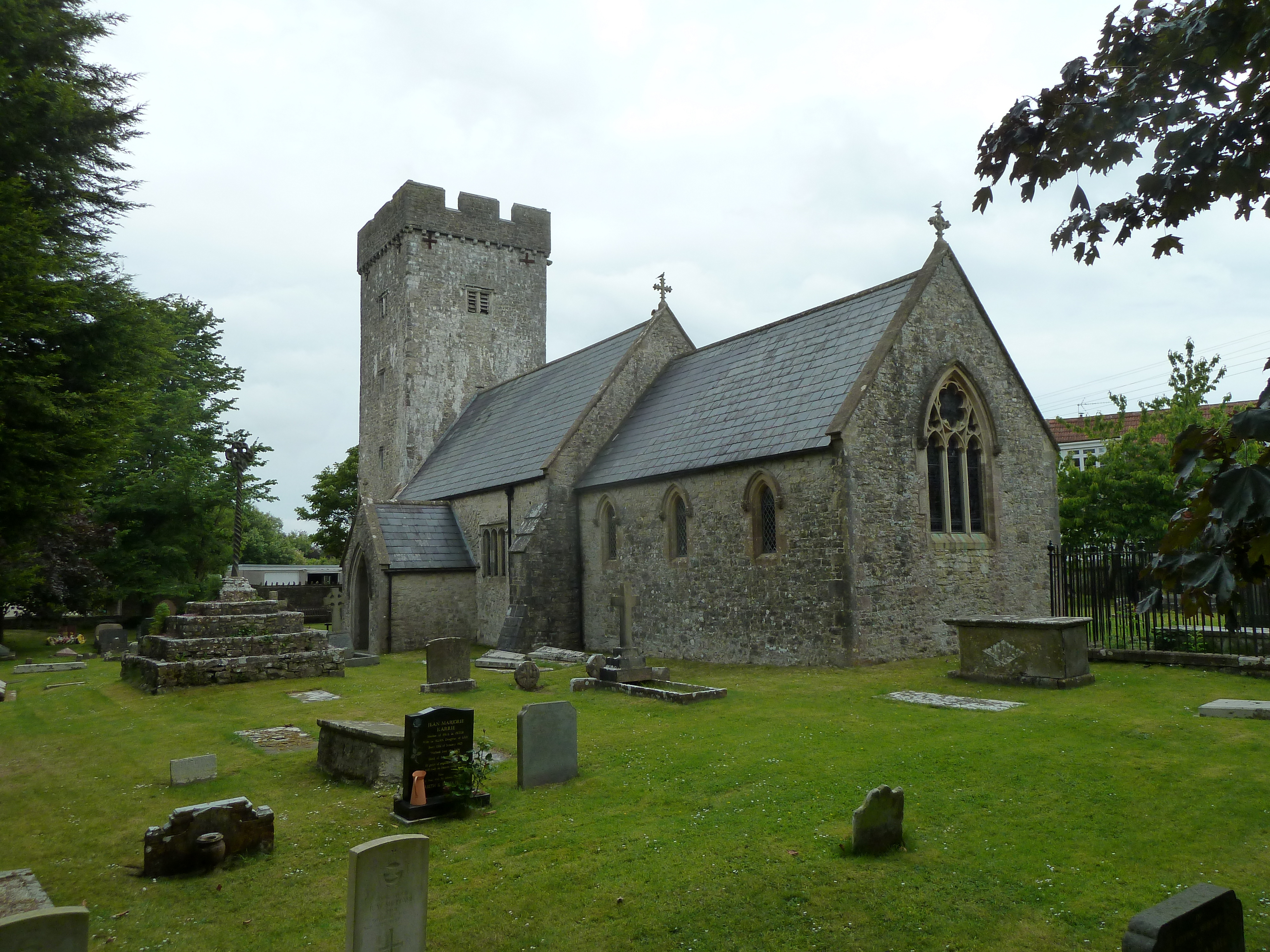
St Cattwg's Church, Llanmaes

There may have been a church at Llanmaes as early as the 5th or 6th century, but the church we see today (St Cattwg's) was built in the 13th century with the earliest mention in 1254. The four-stage tower was added in 1632 and the church was restored in the late Victorian period.

Today St Cattwg's is one of the nine churches making up the Rectorial Benefice of Llantwit Major within the Church in Wales. It is a tranquil place with a number of interesting medieval features. Historic highlights include a beautifully carved Norman tub font, probably of 12th-century date, with a decorated rim. The lower part of the chancel screen is Victorian, but the upper part is late medieval and incorporates part of the original 15th-century rood screen.

On the north wall of the church is a mysterious faded wall painting depicting what appears to be of St George and dragon. Some claim that the medieval picture depicts a Biblical scene from the Book of Revelation. Others have speculated that it represents St George, the dragon and a princess with long blonde hair. The dragon figure is quite worn but you can make out its forked tongue. The princess's parents appear to look down from the upper right of the scene while the knight is at the upper left, with flowing yellow hair and a red cross on either shoulder.

Outside in the churchyard is the base of an old preaching cross, used as a pulpit by John Wesley when he visited Llanmaes on Tuesday April 4, 1749. He wrote in his journal; "At twelve I preached at Lanmais, to a loving earnest people, who do not desire to be any wiser than God".

More recently, both the interior and exterior of St Cattwg's Church was used as the location for the fictional wedding of Gavin Shipman and Stacey West in the hit BBC TV comedy show Gavin and Stacey.

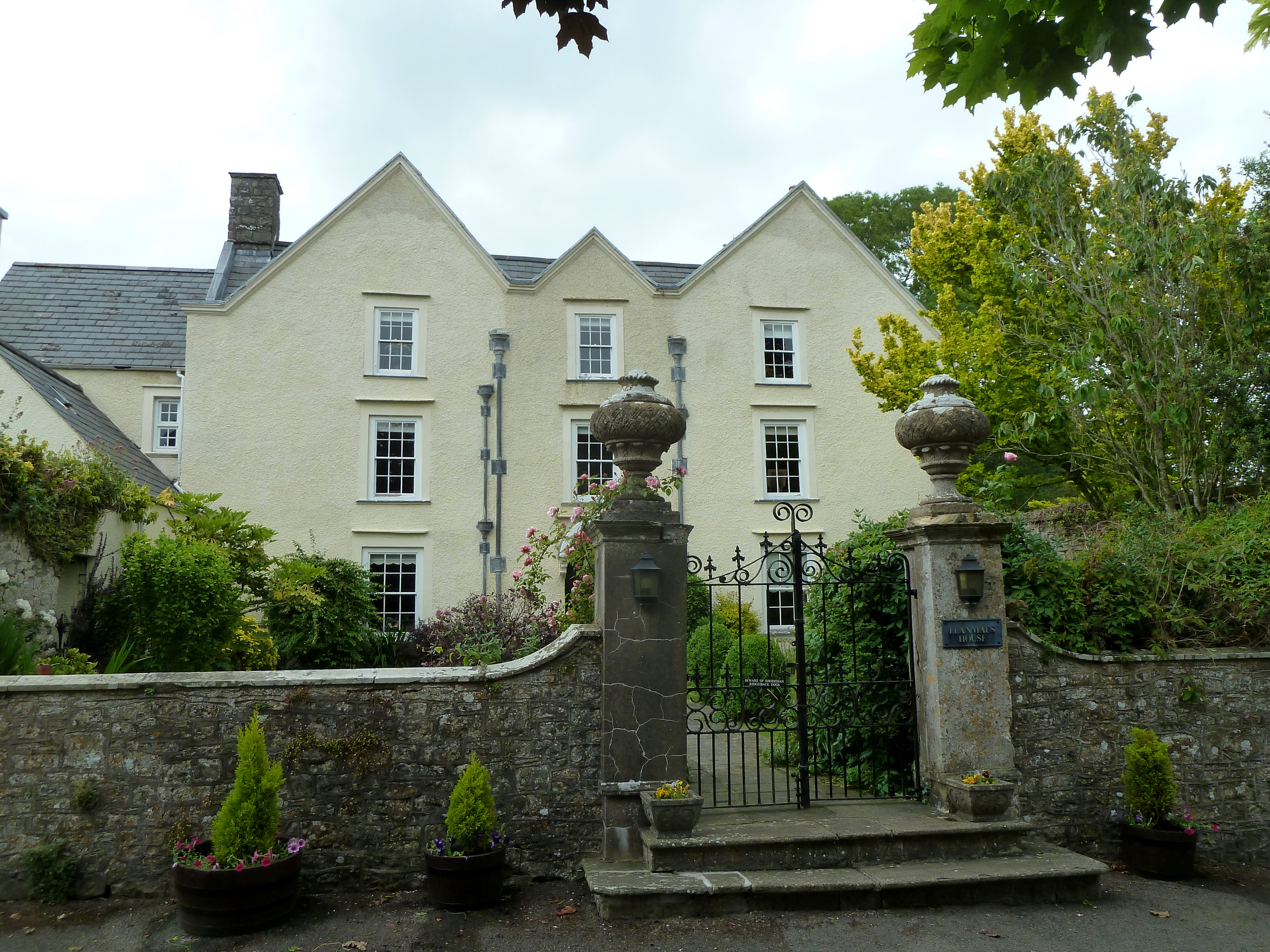
Llanmaes House

The village has one long road going through the middle of the village, linking Llantwit with Cowbridge and passing through the village of St Mary Church. Also, along this section of the village which has the oldest, most picturesque cottages and houses lie the remains of the keep to the Norman Malefant Castle, which is now a ruin and lies behind a modern house. Much of the village now consists of relatively modern detached housing along the main Llanmaes road. The Village green has been preserved, across from the village's only remaining public house, "The Blacksmiths Arms", with the old forge opposite. The original Brown Lion pub and quaint post-office/village shop building, now both private dwellings, can be seen in the older part of the village. Llanmaes has a village hall.

Llanmaes Brook flows through the heart of the village before bending East and draining away towards Eglwys Brewis.

Finally, Llanmaes House is a large, lime washed building sited opposite the church, communal playing fields and children's playground and is of much historical interest. It dates from circa 1600 and is Grade II* listed.

The village has won the Vale of Glamorgan Best Kept Village competition on many occasions, including 1996, 1997, 1998, 2000, 2001, 2008 and 2009. In 1997 it also won the National Village of the Year Award (Community Life category).

In early 2014 Sainsbury's proposed building a large supermarket in Llanmaes.
