= Sutton, Vale of Glamorgan =

Coordinates: 51.4395°N 3.5187°W

Sutton
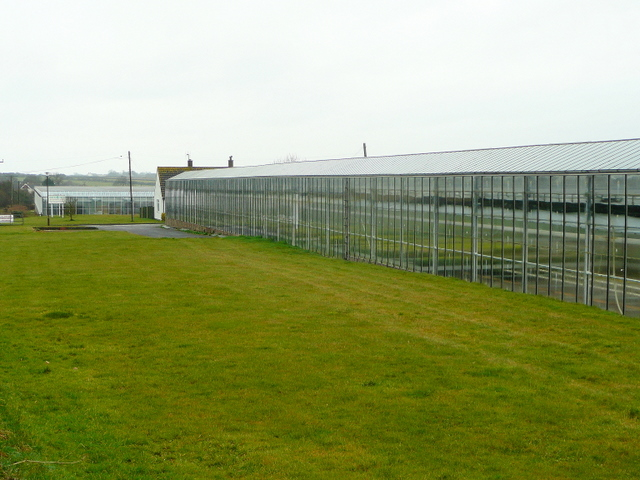
- Springfield Nurseries

- Location within the Vale of Glamorgan
- Principal area: Vale of Glamorgan
- Preserved county: South Glamorgan
- Country: Wales
- Sovereign state: United Kingdom
- Post town: COWBRIDGE
- Postcode district: CF71
- Police: South Wales
- Fire: South Wales
- Ambulance: Welsh
- UK Parliament: Vale of Glamorgan
- Senedd Cymru – Welsh Parliament: Vale of Glamorgan

Sutton is a small hamlet in the Vale of Glamorgan, just south of Llandow.

== History ==
Sutton was once home to the Turbervill family, and Edward Turbervill once had his seat at Sutton. A Bronze Age barrow has been unearthed in Sutton. In 1940, Sir Cyril Fox was said to have found "a primary burial of a typical Beaker man, crouched in a large pit cut into the subsoil, with a Beaker of debased 'B1' type and barbed and tanged flint arrow-heads."

== Notable landmarks ==
It contains three listed buildings, Sutton Farmhouse which is Grade II* listed and the "Long Range of Outbuildings to Northwest of Sutton Farmhouse" and "Small Outbuilding immediately to West of Sutton Farmhouse" which are Grade II listed. Nearby is Llandow Industrial Estate and Springfield Nurseries, a major supplier of pot Chrysanthemums to the UK market.

A 5 bedroom mansion in Sutton named The Granary was valued at £730,000 as of August 2011, making it amongst the most expensive properties in the county.
