= Dyffryn, Vale of Glamorgan =

Coordinates: 51.437466°N 3.305693°W

Dyffryn: Welsh: Dyffryn
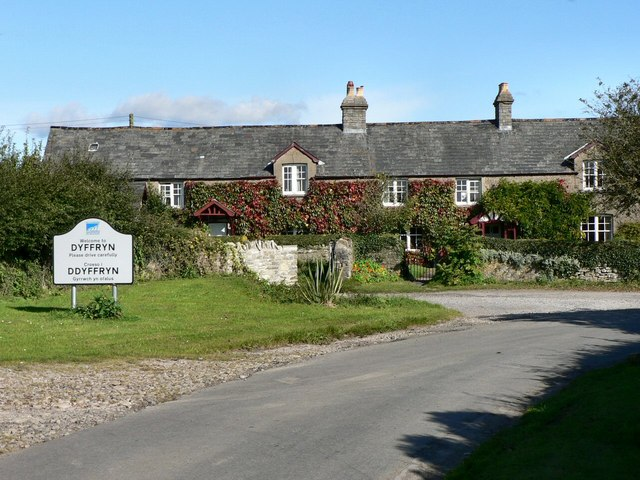
- Dyffryn village

- Location within the Vale of Glamorgan
- Community: Wenvoe; St Nicholas and Bonvilston
- Principal area: Vale of Glamorgan
- Preserved county: South Glamorgan
- Country: Wales
- Sovereign state: United Kingdom
- Postcode district: CF
- Police: South Wales
- Fire: South Wales
- Ambulance: Welsh
- UK Parliament: Vale of Glamorgan
- Senedd Cymru – Welsh Parliament: Vale of Glamorgan

Dyffryn, often Duffryn, is a village in the communities of Wenvoe and St Nicholas and Bonvilston, in the Vale of Glamorgan in south Wales. It is located 4.8 miles (7.7 km) north of the town centre of Barry, roughly 1 mile (1.6 km) west of St Lythans and 2 miles (3.2 km) south of St. Nicholas. It lies off the A4226 road (Five Mile Lane), along St Lythans Road, directly east of Walterston. Dyffryn is best known for its Dyffryn Gardens and its megalithic monuments nearby including the Tinkinswood and St Lythans Burial Chamber and also the caves of nearby Goldsland. The River Waycock flows through the village.

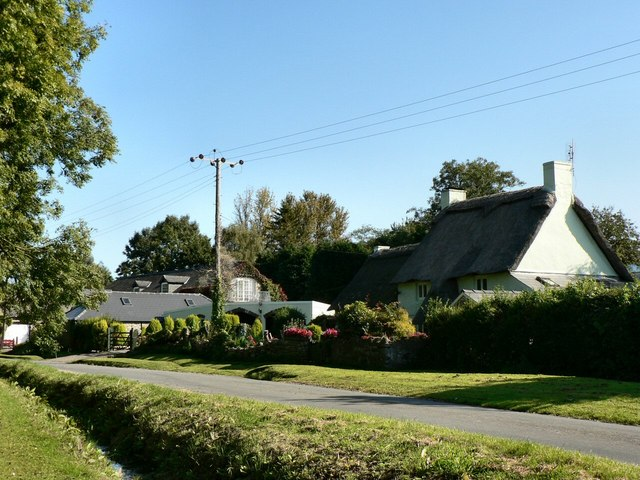
Thatched cottage and road through Dyffryn

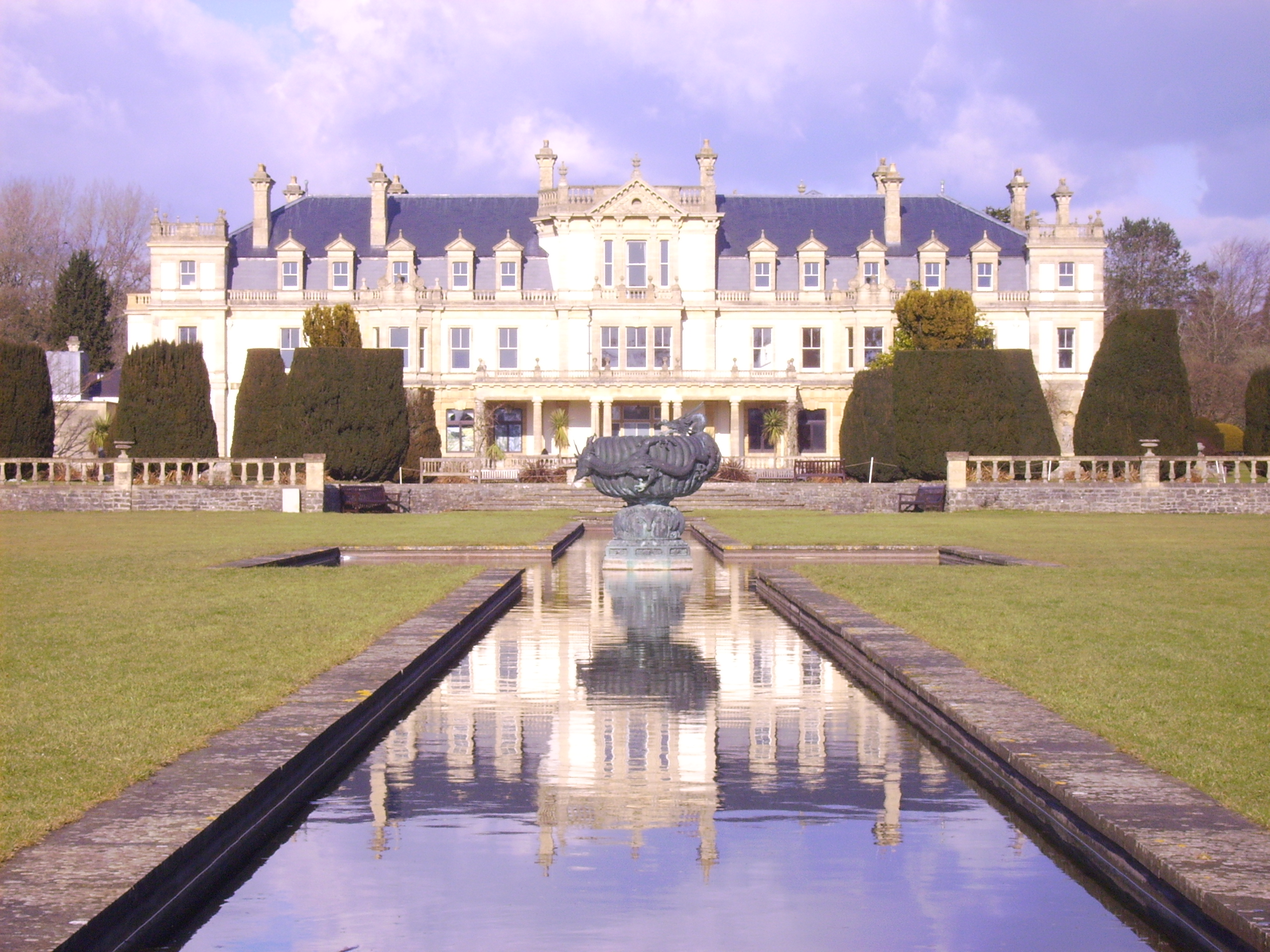
Dyffryn House and Gardens

The Dyffryn Estate dates back to 640 A.D. when the Manor of Worlton (also known as Worleton), which included St Lythans and St Nicholas, was granted to Bishop Oudoceus of Llandaff. Dyffryn House and its Edwardian garden are Grade I listed buildings and are leased to the National Trust. The 22 hectare (55 acre) landscaped gardens were designed by Thomas Mawson between 1894 and 1909, and are the largest and "most exotic" in Glamorgan.

The village itself is a wealthy community with a number of quaint houses and farms. It also contains the Dyffryn Nurseries, Wayside Cattery, and an Aqua farm, Dyffryn Springs in Lower Dyffryn, which is a noted commercial fishing spot for trout in the county, located to the south of the main village near the hamlet of Great Hamston.

The 1811 Topographical Dictionary of Wales simply said "DYFFRYN, in the Cwmwd of Is Caeth, Cantref of Brenhinol (now called the Hundred of Dinas Powys), Co. of Glamorgan, South Wales; in the Parish of St. Nicholas. It is 6 m. W. b. S. from Caerdiff. Near Dyffryn House, which is the Property of The Honourable William Booth Grey, are several Druidical Monuments."

== Notable people ==
- Ivor Wynne (1918–1970), Canadian educator and university administrator
