= Llampha =

Coordinates: 51.469°N 3.552°W

Llampha: Welsh: Llanffa
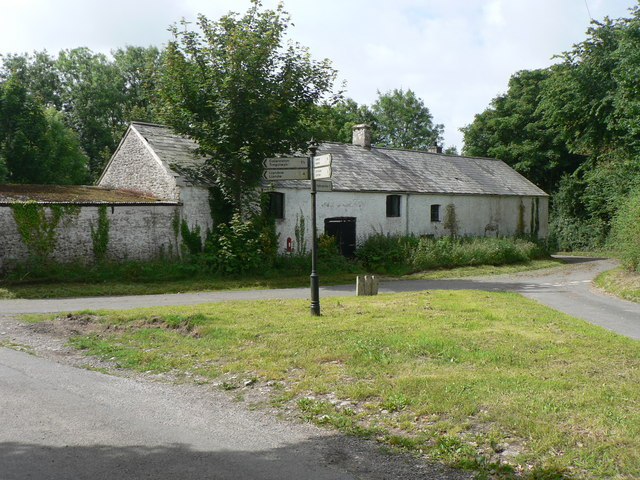
- Llampha

- Location within the Vale of Glamorgan
- OS grid reference: SS923756
- Principal area: Vale of Glamorgan
- Preserved county: South Glamorgan
- Country: Wales
- Sovereign state: United Kingdom
- Postcode district: CF
- Police: South Wales
- Fire: South Wales
- Ambulance: Welsh
- UK Parliament: Vale of Glamorgan
- Senedd Cymru – Welsh Parliament: Vale of Glamorgan

Llampha (also Lampha, Welsh: Llanffa) is a hamlet in the Vale of Glamorgan, South Wales, near Bridgend. It mainly consists of farms and smallholdings.
