= A4226 road =

Road in the Vale of Glamorgan

Coordinates: 51.4304°N 3.3238°W

A4226

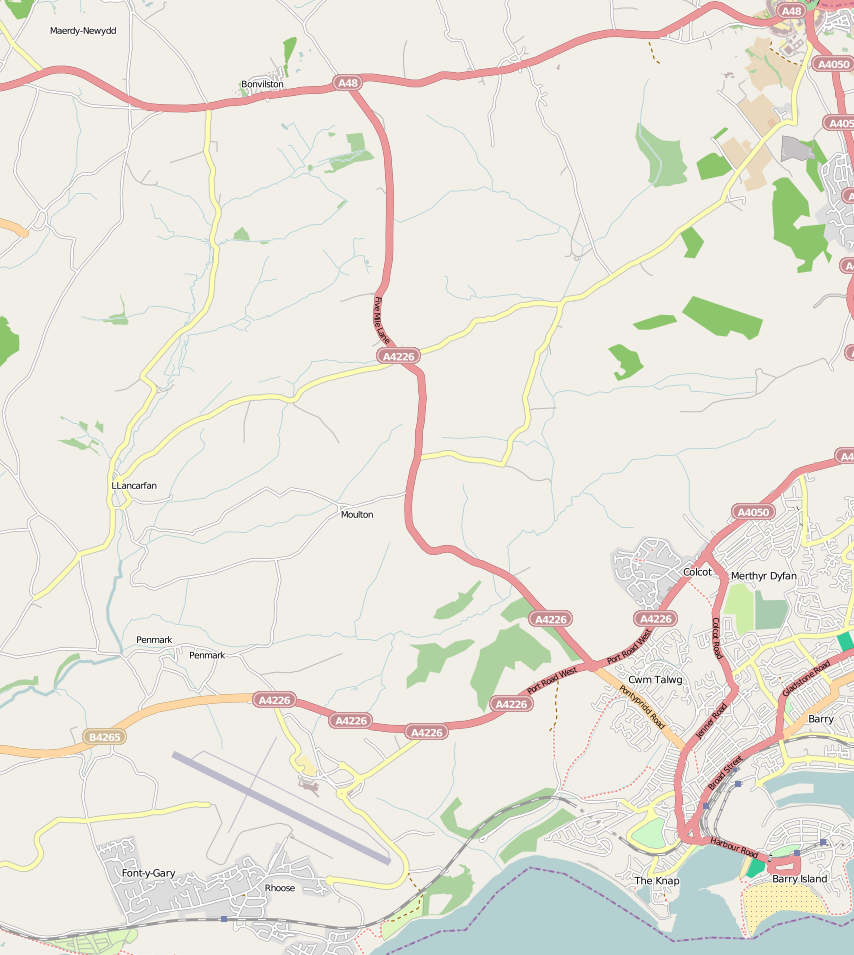

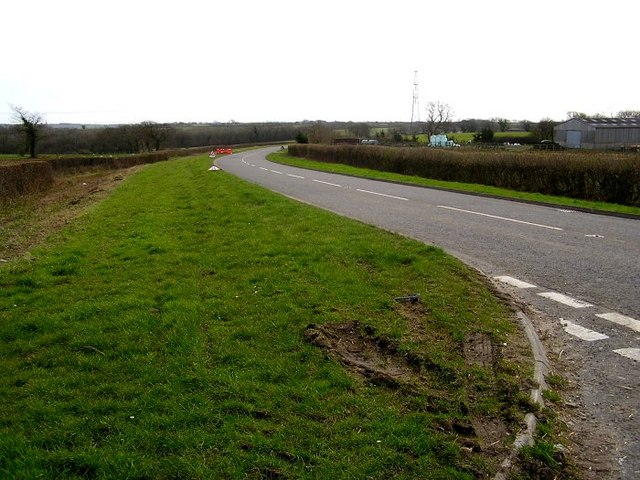

Major junctions
- North end: Bonvilston
- A48 A4050
- South end: Cardiff International Airport

Location
- Country: United Kingdom
- Constituent country: Wales

Road network
- Roads in the United Kingdom; Motorways; A and B road zones

The A4226 (better known as The Five Mile Lane) is a main road linking Bonvilston to Barry and Cardiff International Airport (CIA) in the Vale of Glamorgan, Wales.

== Road course ==
=== First stage ===
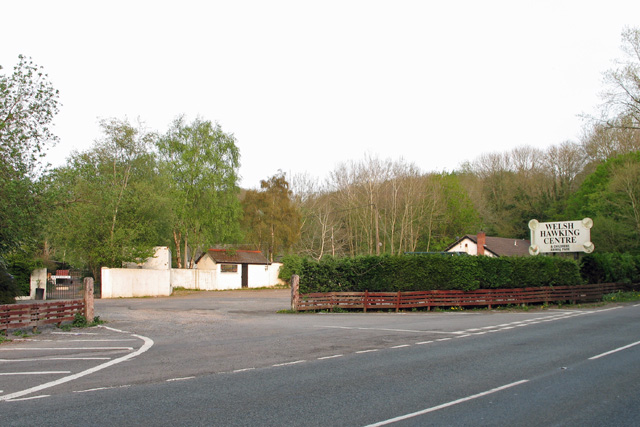
Welsh Hawking Centre from the A4226 road near Weycock Cross

The A4226 begins at the junction with the A48 road (Sycamore Cross) just east of Bonvilston and south of Gwern-y-Steeple and Peterston-Super-Ely. It heads in a southerly direction past numerous farms and country lanes leading off to hamlets such as Llancadle, Moulton, Walterston and Dyffryn Gardens etc., past the Welsh Hawking Centre until the junction with Port Road (leading to the A4050 road at Colcot roundabout) at Weycock Cross in northwestern Barry.

==== The Five Mile Lane ====
This initial stage of the road is widely known locally as The Five Mile Lane, in fact it is nearer 4 miles today but historically the road extended along what is now Pontypridd Road in Barry to Romilly, roughly 5 miles in total.

=== Second stage ===
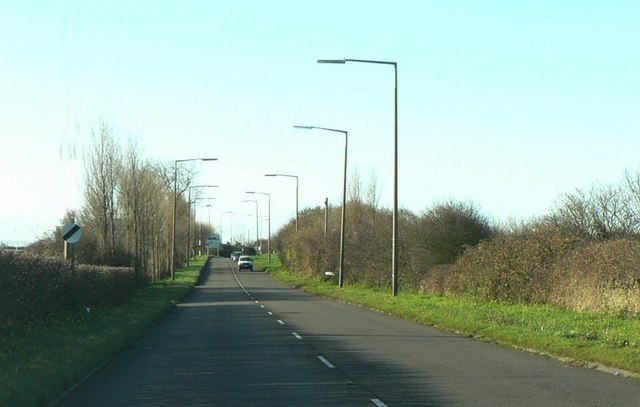
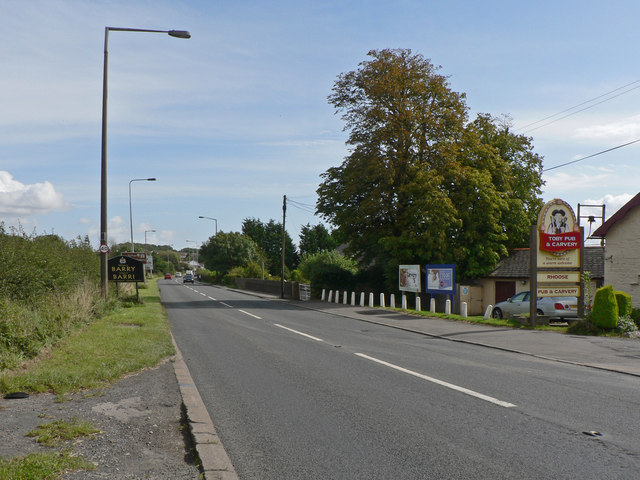
Left: Heading west to Cardiff International Airport. Right: Heading east outside Cwm Ciddi inn on the outskirts of Barry, approaching the roundabout at Weycock Cross.

However, the A4226 route forks some 120 degrees at Weycock Cross to the right as one approaches the roundabout, where it continues in a westerly direction (continuation of Port Road West) along the northern perimeter of the airport until the entrance to the airport at the Tredogan roundabout. At this roundabout it becomes the B4265 road which leads to Llantwit Major and eventually to Bridgend and the turn off to the north leads to Penmark.

== Maintenance ==
On 1 July 1970, the Weycock section of the road was formally upgraded to Principal Road Status after being widened and improved. There is currently a proposal to upgrade this road to improve access to CIA. The improvements include adding straighter sections and other works to increase speeds along the road, and to extend the route designation to include the road between Sycamore Cross and the M4 Motorway Junction 34 (Miskin). The extension would also have upgrades including straighter sections to allow for faster speeds.
