= Llanbethery =

Coordinates: 51.4190°N 3.3843°W

Llanbethery (Welsh: Llanbydderi) is a small village in the Vale of Glamorgan, south Wales. It is part of the community of Llancarfan.

Llanbethery was once served by Llanbethery Platform railway station. This opened in 1905 and closed in 1920.

== Location ==
It is located between Barry and Llanblethian to the west of Cardiff, near Cardiff Airport.

== Notes ==
C. Chapman (1985) The Cowbridge Railway. Oxford Publishing Company. pg 97
