= St Lythans =

Coordinates: 51.448333°N 3.2825°W

St Lythans: Welsh: Llwyneliddon
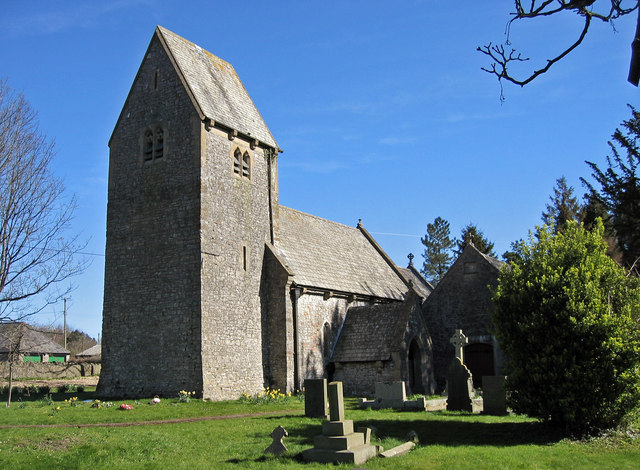
- St.Lythans Parish Church

- Location within the Vale of Glamorgan
- Principal area: Vale of Glamorgan
- Preserved county: South Glamorgan
- Country: Wales
- Sovereign state: United Kingdom
- Postcode district: CF
- Police: South Wales
- Fire: South Wales
- Ambulance: Welsh
- UK Parliament: Vale of Glamorgan
- Senedd Cymru – Welsh Parliament: Vale of Glamorgan

St Lythans (Welsh: Llwyneliddon) is a hamlet and former parish in the Vale of Glamorgan, southeast Wales, just outside western Cardiff. It lies southwest of Culverhouse Cross, west of Wenvoe and southwest of Twyn-yr-Odyn and is also connected by road from Dyffryn and the Five Mile Lane in the west. The megalithic St Lythans burial chamber, over 6000 years old, lies 1 km to the west of the village and the hamlet also contains the St.Lythans Parish Church or Church of St Bleddian, a Grade II* listed building.

== History ==
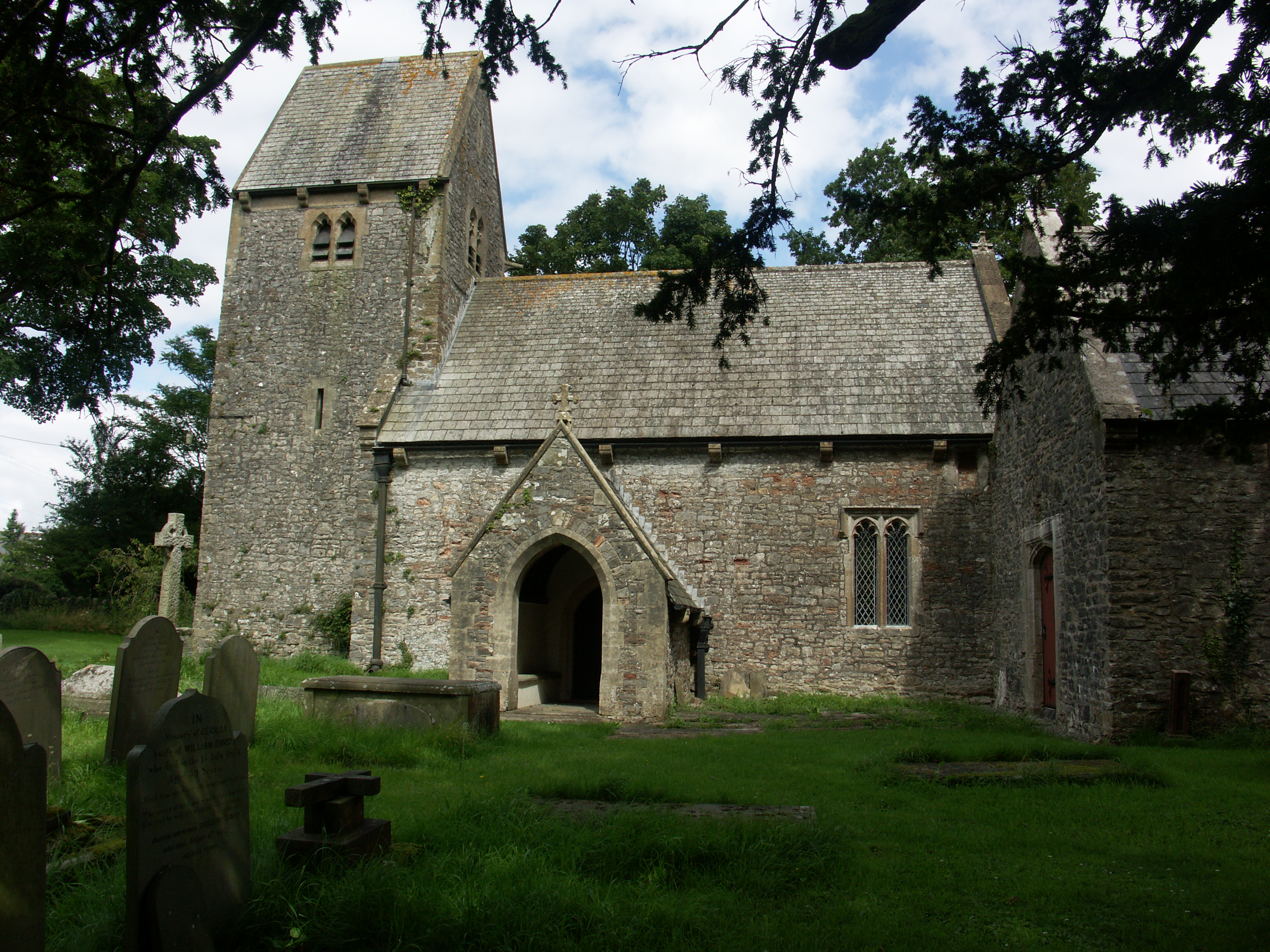
St Lythans Church, a 12th-c. example of Norman architecture; it may have been built over a pagan worship-ground

The hamlet's namesake is Saint Lupus of Troyes, a Gaulish bishop who was invited to Britain to eliminate heresy in 429 AD. In the 16th century, the manor in the area was acquired by the Button family, who built the first house about 500 yards (0.46 km) north west of the tumulus. The Manor's name was changed to Dyffryn St Nicholas and the house rebuilt in the 18th century, when the estate was purchased by Thomas Pryce. Worlton Manor was also prominent in this area for some time. Commenting on St Lythans in his 'A Topographical Dictionary of The Dominion of Wales', London, 1811, Nicholas Carlisle, says "The Resident Population of this Parish, in 1801, was 72. It is 6m. W. S.W. from Caerdiff (sic)." and notes that "Here is a Druidical Altar." (Note the spelling of Cardiff, which corresponds closely to the current local Cardiff pronunciation.) By 1831, the population had grown by over 50% ("Lythan's, St. (St. Lythian), a parish in the hundred of Dinas-Powis, county of Glamorgan, South Wales, 6 miles (W. S. W.) from Cardiff, containing 103 inhabitants.") and Dyffryn House was being used as "a school for all the poor children of this parish". By now, the dolmen had been correctly identified: "There is a cromlech on St. Lythan's common." (From 'A Topographical Dictionary of Wales' by Samuel Lewis, 1833). Census records show that St Lythans' population fluctuated between 81 (1881) and 136 (1861) over the rest of the 19th century. In 1939, the Dyffryn Estate was leased to the Glamorgan County Council for 999 years.

The area is little changed from the mid 19th century, when Llowe's 'A Topographical Dictionary of Wales' (1849) said: "There is a cromlech on a farm belonging to the Dyfryn (sic) estate; it is near the road-side, about half a mile west of the church, on the approach to Dyfryn (sic) village".

== Geography ==
St Lythans is a small rural settlement in the Vale of Glamorgan, midway between the villages of Wenvoe and St Nicholas, about four miles (6.4 km) west-south-west of Cardiff.

The burial chamber stands in a field, Maesyfelin (The Mill Field), often shared by a herd of cows, to the south of St Lythans Road. Roadside parking is available, for 2—3 cars, about 50 yards (46 m) from the site, which is maintained by Cadw (to keep), the Welsh Historic Environment Agency. Access to the field, which slopes gently downwards towards the north west, is permitted, and is free, via a kissing gate. There is no wheelchair access, although there is an uninterrupted view of the site from the gate, about 50 yards (46 m) away.

To the south of the hamlet is Goldsland and wood, where a notable archaeological excavation has been conducted by the University of Central Lancashire since 2005.
