= Broughton, Vale of Glamorgan =

Coordinates: 51.4275°N 3.5525°W

Broughton: Welsh: Brychdwn
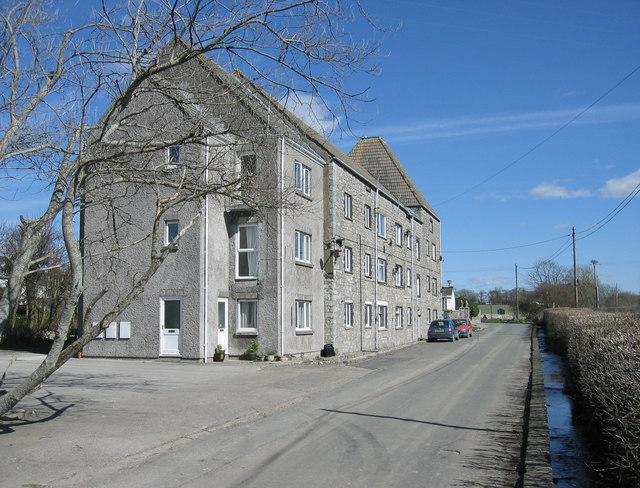
- The Malthouse

- Location within the Vale of Glamorgan
- OS grid reference: SS922710
- Principal area: Vale of Glamorgan
- Preserved county: South Glamorgan
- Country: Wales
- Sovereign state: United Kingdom
- Postcode district: CF
- Police: South Wales
- Fire: South Wales
- Ambulance: Welsh
- UK Parliament: Vale of Glamorgan
- Senedd Cymru – Welsh Parliament: Vale of Glamorgan

Broughton (Welsh: Brychdwn) is a small village in the western part of the Vale of Glamorgan, southeast Wales. It lies just northeast of Monknash and south of Wick. It contains a building known as "The Malthouse", now converted into flats. The village has extensive remains of a grange of the former Cistercian Neath Abbey including a dove cote and tithe barn.
