= Wick, Vale of Glamorgan =

Wick: Welsh: Y Wig
- Location within the Vale of Glamorgan
- Population: 698
- OS grid reference: SS923721
- Community: Wick
- Principal area: Vale of Glamorgan
- Preserved county: South Glamorgan
- Country: Wales
- Sovereign state: United Kingdom
- Post town: COWBRIDGE
- Postcode district: CF71
- Dialling code: 01656
- Police: South Wales
- Fire: South Wales
- Ambulance: Welsh
- UK Parliament: Vale of Glamorgan
- Senedd Cymru – Welsh Parliament: Vale of Glamorgan
- List of places UK Wales Vale of Glamorgan 51.4376°N 3.5508°W Map of the community

Wick (Welsh: Y Wig) is a small village and community in the Vale of Glamorgan in Wales, situated approximately 1.5 miles (2.4 km) from the coast. The closest towns are Llantwit Major, Cowbridge and Bridgend. The community includes Broughton.

== Amenities ==
The village has two pubs, a village shop and a primary school. There are several footpaths and bridleways linking Wick with the surrounding countryside and the village is popular with cyclists. Walks from Wick include those to the local beaches, Traeth Bach and Traeth Mawr, via the Cwm Nash footpath at Monknash or from Dunraven Bay at Southerndown. The cliffs here form part of the Glamorgan Heritage Coast.

== History ==
Archaeological evidence (such as the earthworks associated with burial mounds, settlements and enclosures) suggests that there was settlement in Wick from around 1600BC when a small proto-Celtic community may have developed, probably farming the surrounding land on a subsistence basis. The site of an ancient beacon tower lies just north-west of the village and to the south-west, on the cliff edge at Whitmore Stairs, is the earthworks of an Iron Age univallate hillfort, part of an ancient monument known as the Cwm Bach Camps. It is thought probable that the larger of the forts that make up this monument, situated approximately 1.5 miles (2.4 km) away on the Trwyn y Witch (Witches Point) headland, was at one time occupied by Caratacus (who led the Silures in resistance to the Roman occupation). Given its proximity to Tusker Rock, a small island named after Tuska (a Danish Viking), it is likely that Wick was a focus for Viking attacks on the south Wales coast. Local folklore suggests that beacons were lit on high ground around the village to warn of such raids and that attacks were fiercely resisted. It is thought that the village eventually came under Norman control in around 1097AD. Scheduled ancient monuments in Wick include Buarth Mawr (comprising a barn) and Rhyle round barrow. Various archaeological finds have been made in Wick, including the discovery of a hoard of five Late Bronze Age socketed axes by Mr. Adrian Jones in 2005.

In later times it is likely that Wick formed part of a medieval drovers route, by-passing the toll road through nearby Cowbridge. A Topographical Dictionary of The Dominion of Wales by Nicholas Carlisle, published 1811, recorded that in 1801 the population of Wick was 259. From 1822 parts of the village and areas of the surrounding land became part of the Dunraven Estate under the 1st Earl of Dunraven. By 1833 the population had risen to 349 according to A Topographical Dictionary of Wales by Samuel Lewis, published 1833, and in 1861 the population had reached 432 according to the 1880 Slaters Commercial Directory. This then decreased to 384 by 1871 (according to the same source) and decreased further to 327 by the time of the 1891 census (the current population is 694 according to the 2001 census). The Slaters Commercial Directory also recorded that there were once 6 public houses in the village (The Carpenter Arms, The Lamb and Flag, The Royal Oak, The Star, The Steady Pointer and The Swan) of which only The Lamb and Flag and The Star remain as public houses today. There are some interesting historical features in the village, the most obvious being the windmill tower, 'Melin Du', built in 1825, and the single storey remnants of a much earlier stone windmill, 'Wick Old Windmill', near to the school. At nearby Broughton there are former brewery malthouses, used from the 1930s to the 1960s by the Quakers as holiday accommodation for children and the elderly, now converted into private flats. Some of the buildings in the village are known to be several hundred years old and 34 are now listed as 'County Treasures'.

The coastline to the south and west of Wick is formed of rocks of the Lower Lias series that display horizontal stratification and are fossil bearing. It is from the top of these cliffs that, according to local folklore, the 'Wreckers of Wick' would, in the times before modern navigation, lure ships onto the rocks by showing false lights and then plunder the cargo. It is recorded that the bodies of drowned sailors were recovered from the beaches by Monks from the monastic grange at nearby Monknash and taken to what is now the Plough & Harrow Inn where they were prepared for burial. Historically this stretch of coastline has one of the highest instances of shipwrecks in Wales, its exposure to the Atlantic swell, south-westerly winds, shallow reefs and the Nash sands bar making it treacherous to shipping. Recorded wrecks on the 5 km stretch of coastline between Trwyn y Witch and Nash Point include: the Royal Hunter (1747), the Indian Prince (1752), the Elizabeth (1753), the Prince (1764), the George (1770), the Industry (1786), the Thomas (1806), the Bee (1820), the Harriet (1827), the Jessie Orasie (1831), the Frolic (1831), the Providence (1832), the Mayflower (1841), the New Felicity (1841), the Vigo (1842), the Betsey (1849), the Lucie (1854), the Williams (1854), the Mary & Deffus (1861), the Gillies (1862), the Elphis (1865), the Amelie (1870), the New Dominian (1872), the Bessie (1872), the John & Eliza (1876), the Jane & Susan (1882), the Ben-y-gloe (1886), the Malleny (1886), the Caterina Camogle (1887), the Denbigh (1888), the Tilburnia (1888), the Claymore (1892), the Lizzie (1892), the Elizabeth Couch (1913), the Narcissus (1916), the Pollensa (1919) and the Cato (1951).

The parish church of Wick is dedicated to Saint James the Great, and like many of the other churches in the parish dates from the twelfth century. It began as a chapel, but was later gifted to Ewenny Priory. It is a Grade II* listed building and consists of a chancel, nave, south porch and western 'saddle back' tower. The church is built in the Early English Period style, although the oldest parts of the structure such as the chancel arch, the south door and a small window in the chancel, all date from the 12th century. The church has a medieval stone mensa (rectangular) altar, views of which are provided through the 'squints' (hagioscopes) from the nave. The altar has unusual niches on either side, which probably contained statues of St James and the Blessed Virgin in centuries past. St James' was the subject of a major Victorian restoration 125 years ago and further additions have been made since then. The registers date from 1813. Wick also has a Unitarian and General Baptist Chapel that has held regular services since 1792.

Approximately 1-mile (1.6 km) to the west of the village is Monks Wood, a 10-acre (40,000 m^{2}) plantation of mixed native woodland species managed by the Woodland Trust and the Monks Wood Committee. The wood was planted with native broadleaved trees and shrubs by villagers from Wick in November 2000. A wide mown path follows a circular route through the site and there is an information display for visitors. Another area of ecological importance is Clemenstone Meadows, directly to the north of the village, comprising 2 traditionally managed meadows on either side of a brook that support a number of rare plant species.

The village was the birthplace of Sir Keith Thomas in 1933 and is currently home to the family of the Olympic gold medallist and World Champion cyclist Nicole Cooke.

Sports clubs in the village include Wick Rugby union Club and the Wick & District Cricket Club.

On 28 November 2006 the village of Wick became the first community in the UK to be switched over to British Telecom's "21st Century Network" (21CN); an advanced high-speed broadband network that will be rolled out throughout the UK over the coming years, replacing all of BT's existing networks. Laura Wess, 11, made the first call using the system from Wick and Marcross Primary School to the Right Reverend John Stewart Davies, bishop of St Asaph, in North Wales.

The village won the South Wales Region Award for the 2008 Calor Village of the Year.
