= Gwern-y-Steeple =

Coordinates: 51.471389°N 3.329444°W

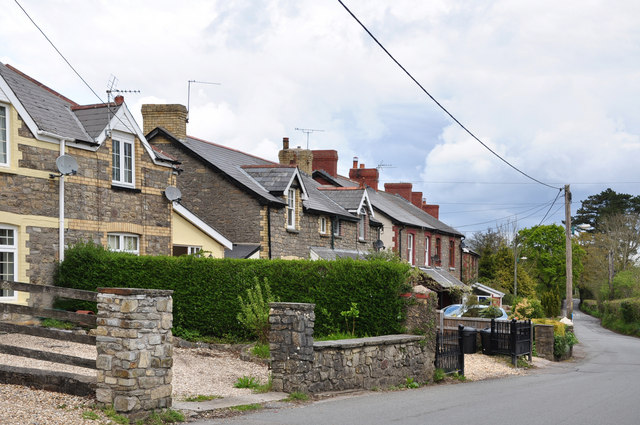
- Cottages along main road

- Location within the Vale of Glamorgan
- OS grid reference: ST077756
- Community: Peterston-super-Ely
- Principal area: Vale of Glamorgan
- Preserved county: South Glamorgan
- Country: Wales
- Sovereign state: United Kingdom
- Post town: Barry
- Postcode district: CF62
- Police: South Wales
- Fire: South Wales
- Ambulance: Welsh
- UK Parliament: Vale of Glamorgan
- Senedd Cymru – Welsh Parliament: Vale of Glamorgan

Gwern-y-steeple is a hamlet in the Vale of Glamorgan, Wales. It lies north of the A48 road and north-west St. Nicholas (to which it is linked by Chapel Lane) on the road south-west of Peterston-Super-Ely. Cottrell Park Golf Club lies to the south. Gwern-y-steeple is part of the village of Peterston-Super-Ely and lies within the catchment area of both Peterson-Super-Ely Church in Wales Primary School and Pendoylan Primary School. The local member of Parliament is Conservative Alun Cairns and is part of the Vale of Glamorgan county council. The local county councillor is Rhodri Traherne.

The village of St. Nicholas once extended as far north as Gwern-y-steeple, with Croes-y-Parc Chapel, originally being within the St. Nicholas boundary.

== Notable people ==
- C. Davis (c.1958-) -potter
