= Llancadle =

Coordinates: 51.4063°N 3.3866°W

Llancadle: Welsh: Llancatal
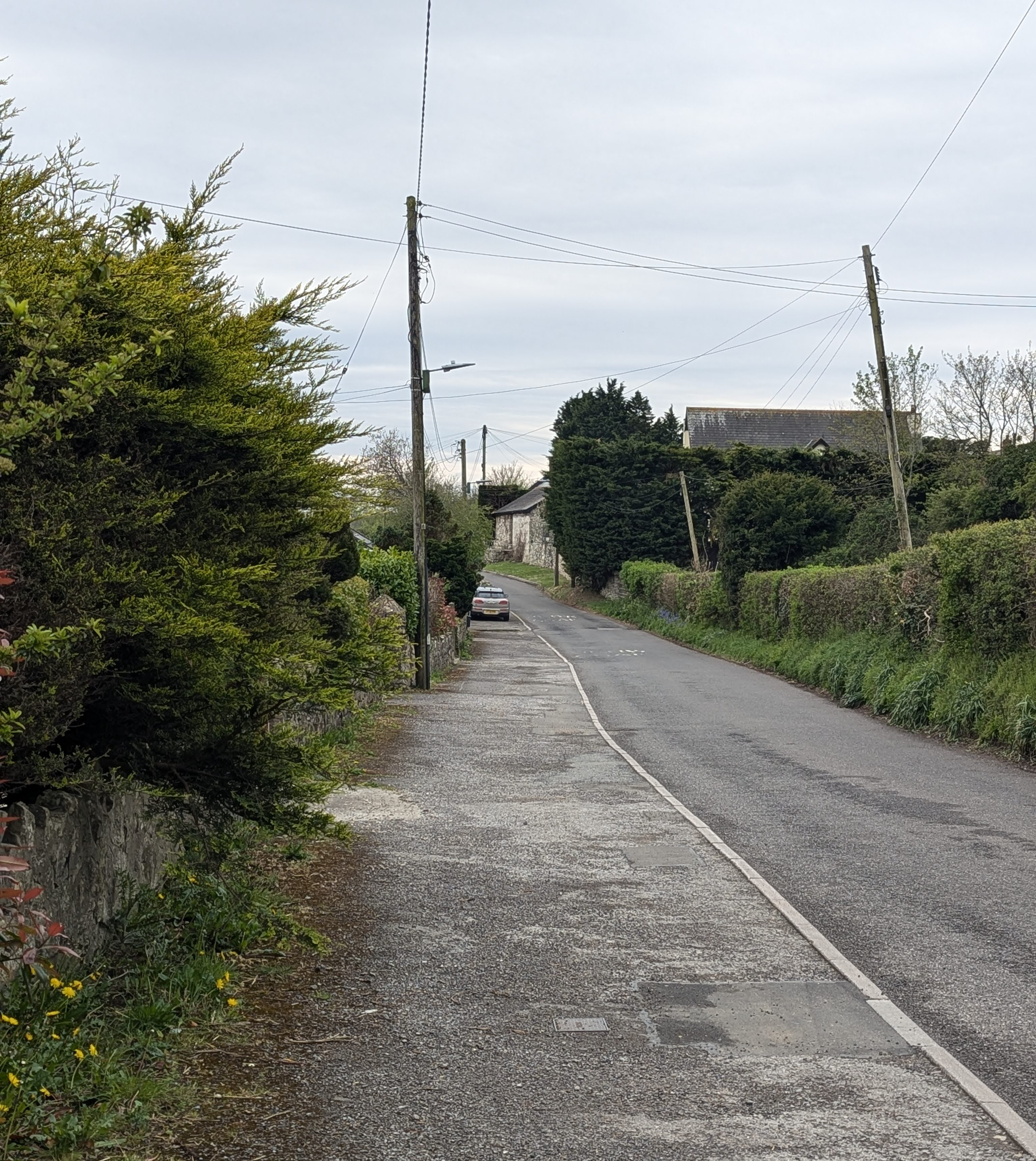
- Llancadle

- Location within the Vale of Glamorgan
- OS grid reference: ST036684
- Principal area: Vale of Glamorgan
- Preserved county: South Glamorgan
- Country: Wales
- Sovereign state: United Kingdom
- Post town: Barry
- Postcode district: CF62
- Police: South Wales
- Fire: South Wales
- Ambulance: Welsh
- UK Parliament: Vale of Glamorgan
- Senedd Cymru – Welsh Parliament: Vale of Glamorgan

Llancadle (Welsh: Llancatal) is a rural village south-west of Barry near Rhoose in the Vale of Glamorgan, in Wales.

Llancadle is located near the international airport for Wales, Cardiff International Airport.

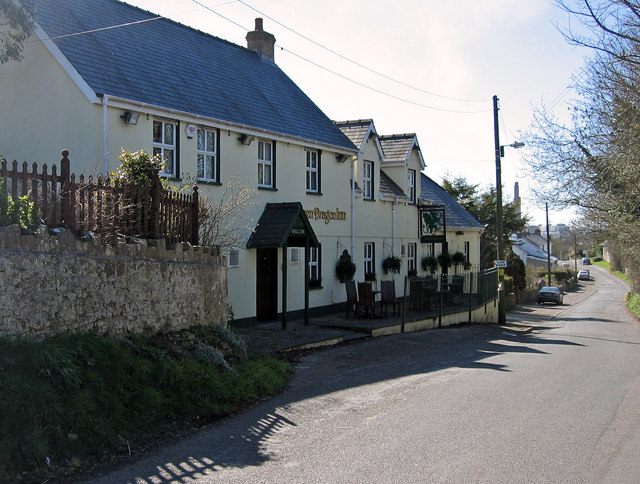
Green Dragon Inn

It has what used to be a pub named the "Green Dragon Inn" at the Northern end of the village. The Green Dragon is now a private residential property.
