= Welsh Hawking Centre =

Falconry centre in Barry, Wales

Coordinates: 51.415°N 3.308°W

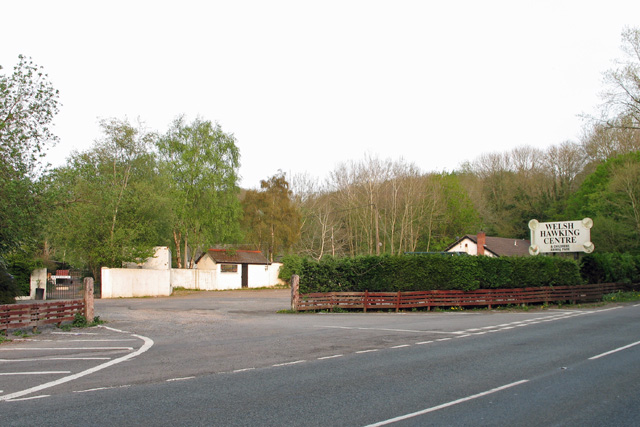
The Welsh Hawking Centre in 2007

The Welsh Hawking Centre and Children's Animal Park is a hawking centre on Weycock Road on the northwestern outskirts of Barry, Vale of Glamorgan, in southern Wales. It contains the largest collection of birds of prey in Wales, with over 200 birds on site including eagles, owls, hawks, falcons and buzzards.

In 2007 seven falcon chicks were stolen from the centre.

According to the centre's website, they are closed indefinitely.
