= Vale of Glamorgan =

County borough in Wales

Vale of Glamorgan County Borough Bwrdeistref Sirol Bro Morgannwg (Welsh)
- County borough
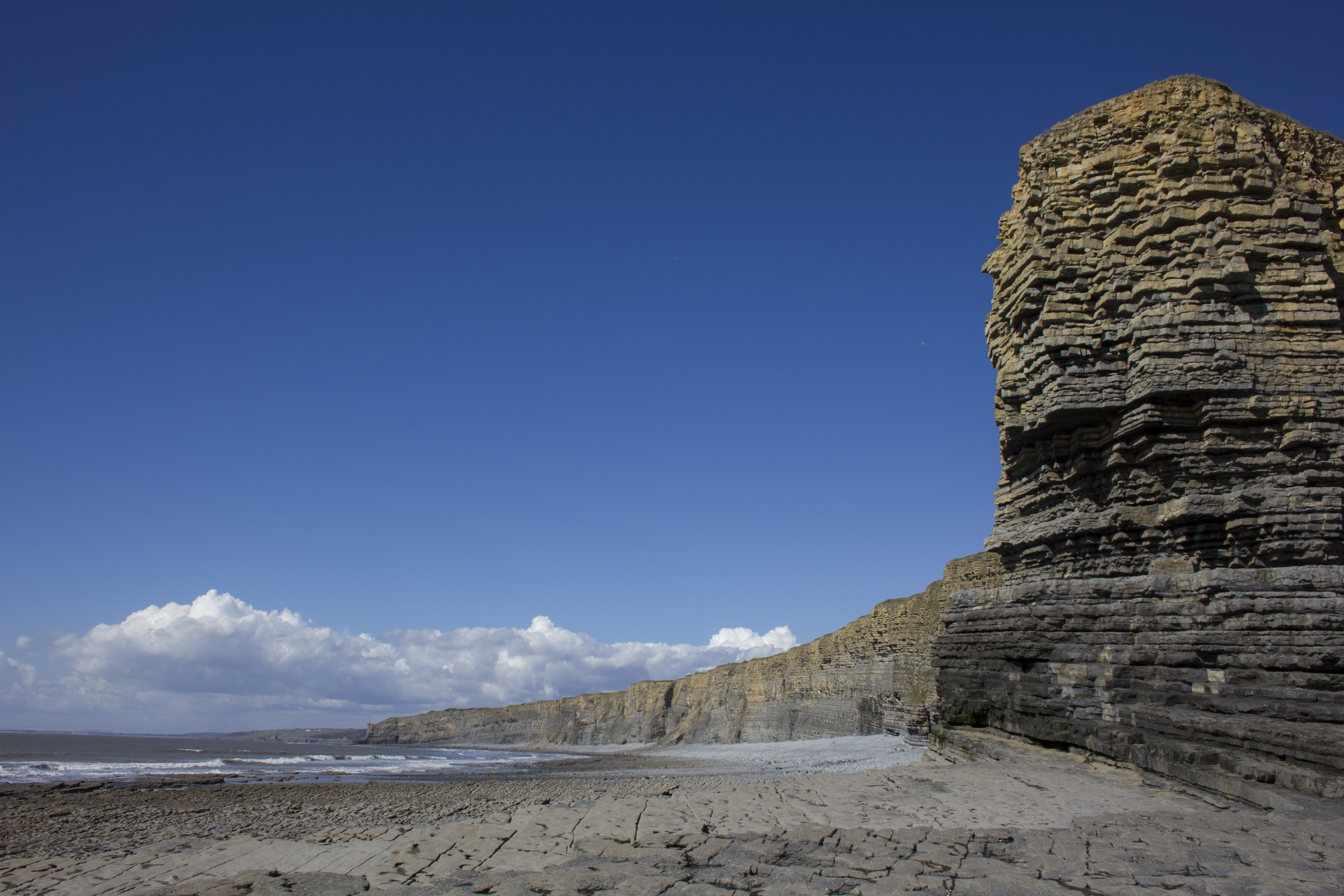
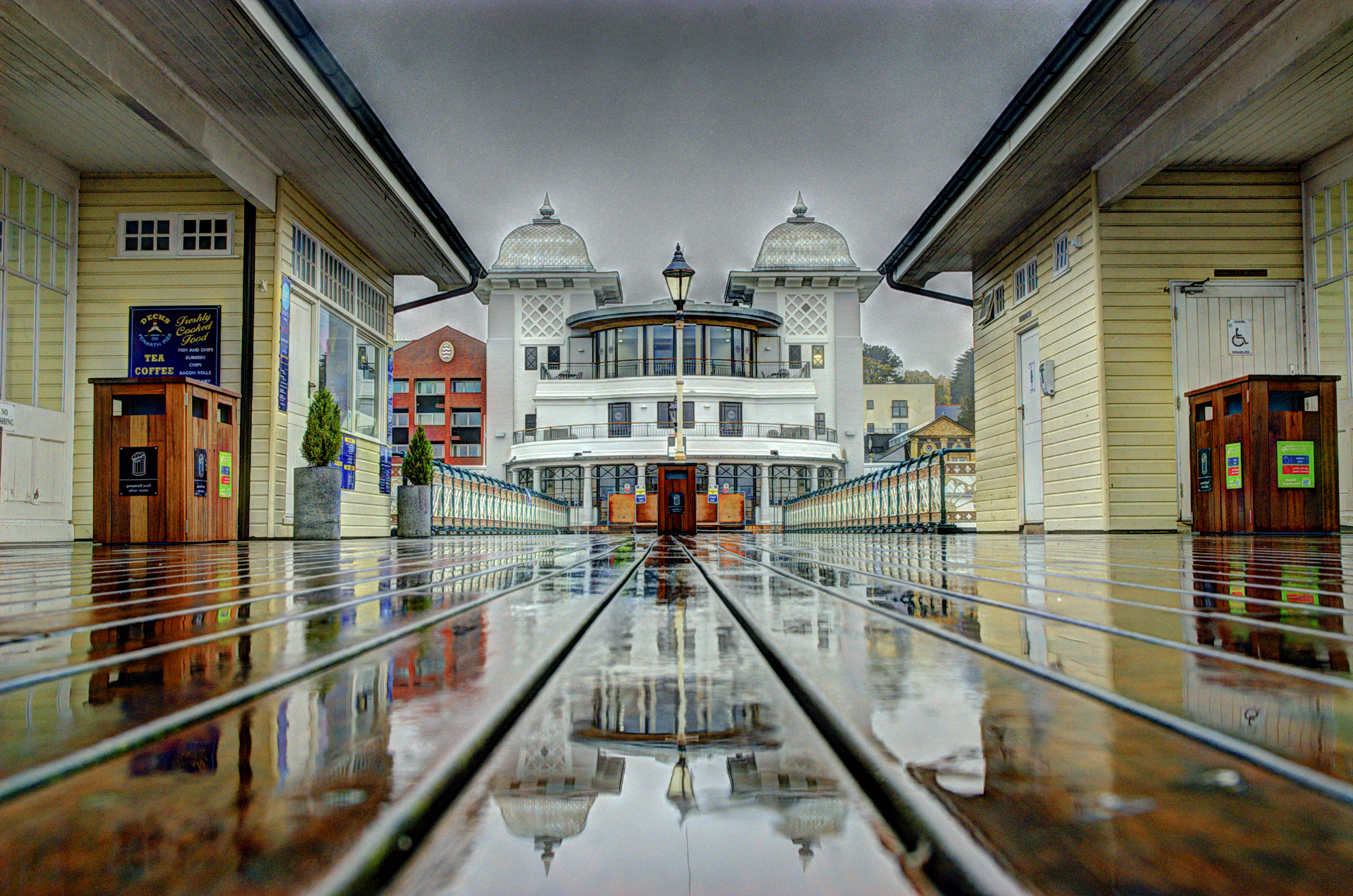
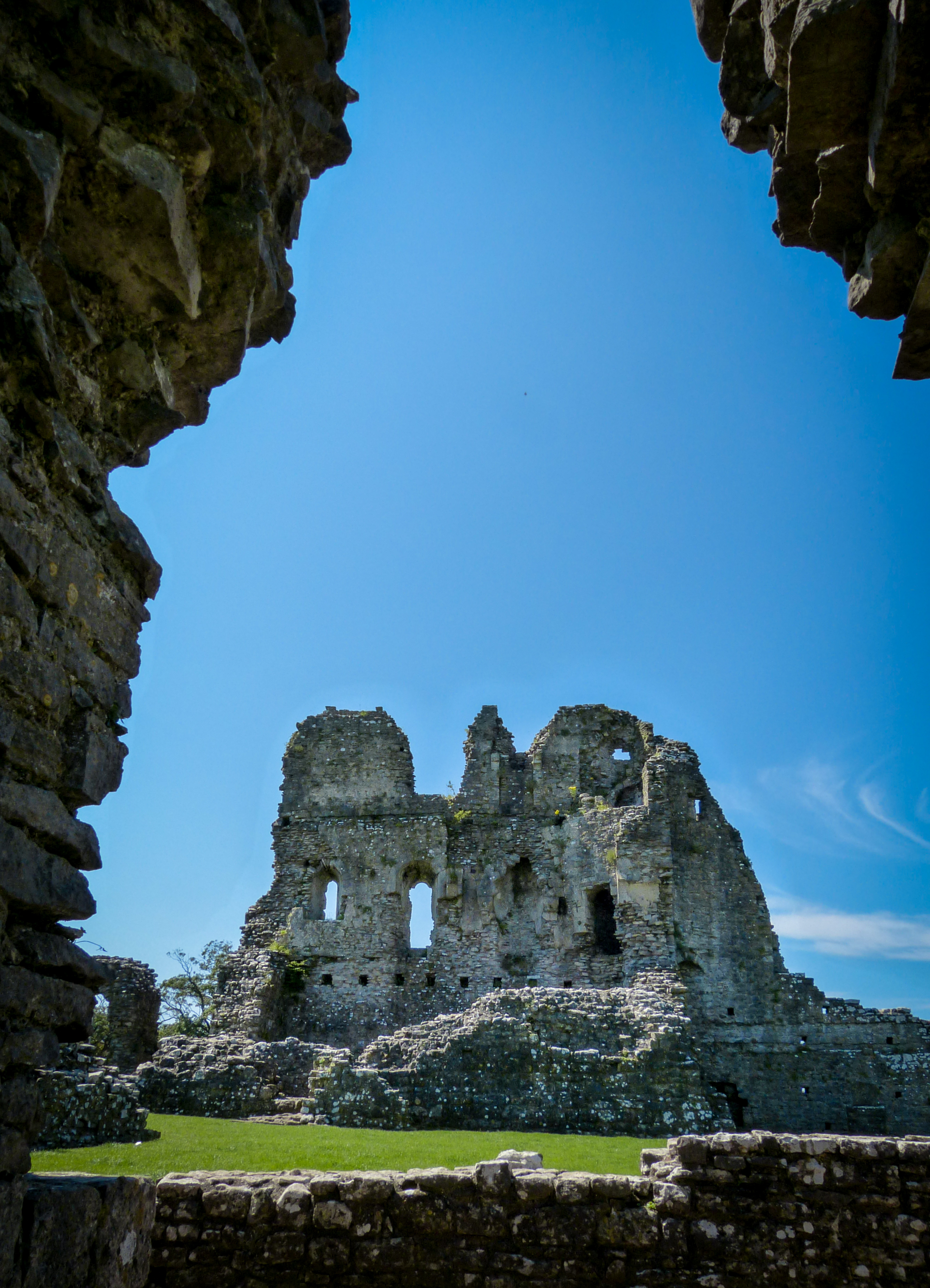
- Left to Right: Near Nash Point on the heritage coast; Penarth Pier and its pavilion; Ogmore Castle

- Coat of arms

- Vale of Glamorgan shown within Wales
- Coordinates: 51°27′N 03°25′W
- Sovereign state: United Kingdom
- Country: Wales
- Preserved county: South Glamorgan
- Incorporated: 1 April 1974
- Unitary authority: 1 April 1996
- Administrative HQ: Barry

Government
  - Type: Principal council
  - Body: Vale of Glamorgan Council
  - Control: No overall control
  - MPs: 2 MPs: Stephen Doughty (L); Kanishka Narayan (L)
  - MSs: 12 MSs: 6 in Caerdydd Penarth; 6 in Pen-y-bont Bro Morgannwg

Area
  - Total: 128 sq mi (331 km^{2})
  - Rank: 15th

Population (2025)
  - Total: 135,362
  - Rank: 11th
  - Density: 1,060/sq mi (409/km^{2})
- Time zone: UTC+0 (GMT)
  - Summer (DST): UTC+1 (BST)
- Postcode areas: CF
- Dialling codes: 01446
- ISO 3166 code: GB-VGL
- GSS code: W06000014
- Website: valeofglamorgan.gov.uk

The Vale of Glamorgan (Welsh: Bro Morgannwg [ˈbroː mɔrˈɡanʊɡ]), locally referred to as The Vale, is a county borough in the south-east of Wales. It borders Bridgend County Borough to the west, Cardiff to the east, Rhondda Cynon Taf to the north, and the Bristol Channel to the south. With an economy based largely on agriculture and chemicals, it is the southernmost unitary authority in Wales. Attractions include Barry Island Pleasure Park, the Barry Tourist Railway, Medieval wall paintings in St Cadoc's Church, Llancarfan, Porthkerry Park, St Donat's Castle, Cosmeston Lakes Country Park and Cosmeston Medieval Village. The largest town is Barry. Other towns include Penarth, Llantwit Major, and Cowbridge. There are many villages in the county borough.

== History ==
The area is the southernmost part of the county of Glamorgan. Between the 11th century and 1536 the area was part of the Lordship of Glamorgan.

In medieval times, the village of Cosmeston, near what is today Penarth in the south east of the county, grew up around a fortified manor house constructed sometime around the 12th century by the De Costentin family. The De Costentins, who originated on the Cotentin peninsula in northern France, were among the first Norman invaders of Wales in the early 12th century following William the Conqueror's invasion of neighbouring England in 1066. The village would have consisted of a number of small stone round houses, or crofts, with thatched roofs.

Clemenstone, to the west, was the seat of several high sheriffs of Glamorganshire, including John Curre who was known to have occupied the estate in 1712. William Curre, known to have lived in Clemenstone in 1766, was also an occupant of Itton Court in Monmouthshire. In the early 19th century, Lady Sale née Wynch, wife of Sir Robert Sale, spent much of her early life on the Clemenstone Estate.

In 1974, the Vale of Glamorgan Borough was created, with a population of 103,000. The Vale of Glamorgan was a second tier district, part of the new county of South Glamorgan, under the Local Government Act 1972. It created several problems in local governance, between the South Glamorgan County Council, Cardiff City Council and the Vale of Glamorgan Borough Council owing to their conflicting interests. It was a turbulent time for governance in the city of Cardiff, as for the first time in its history it had to share authority with the county council, which was larger and better resourced. In April 1996, the Vale of Glamorgan became a county borough (unitary authority) of Wales.

== Geography ==
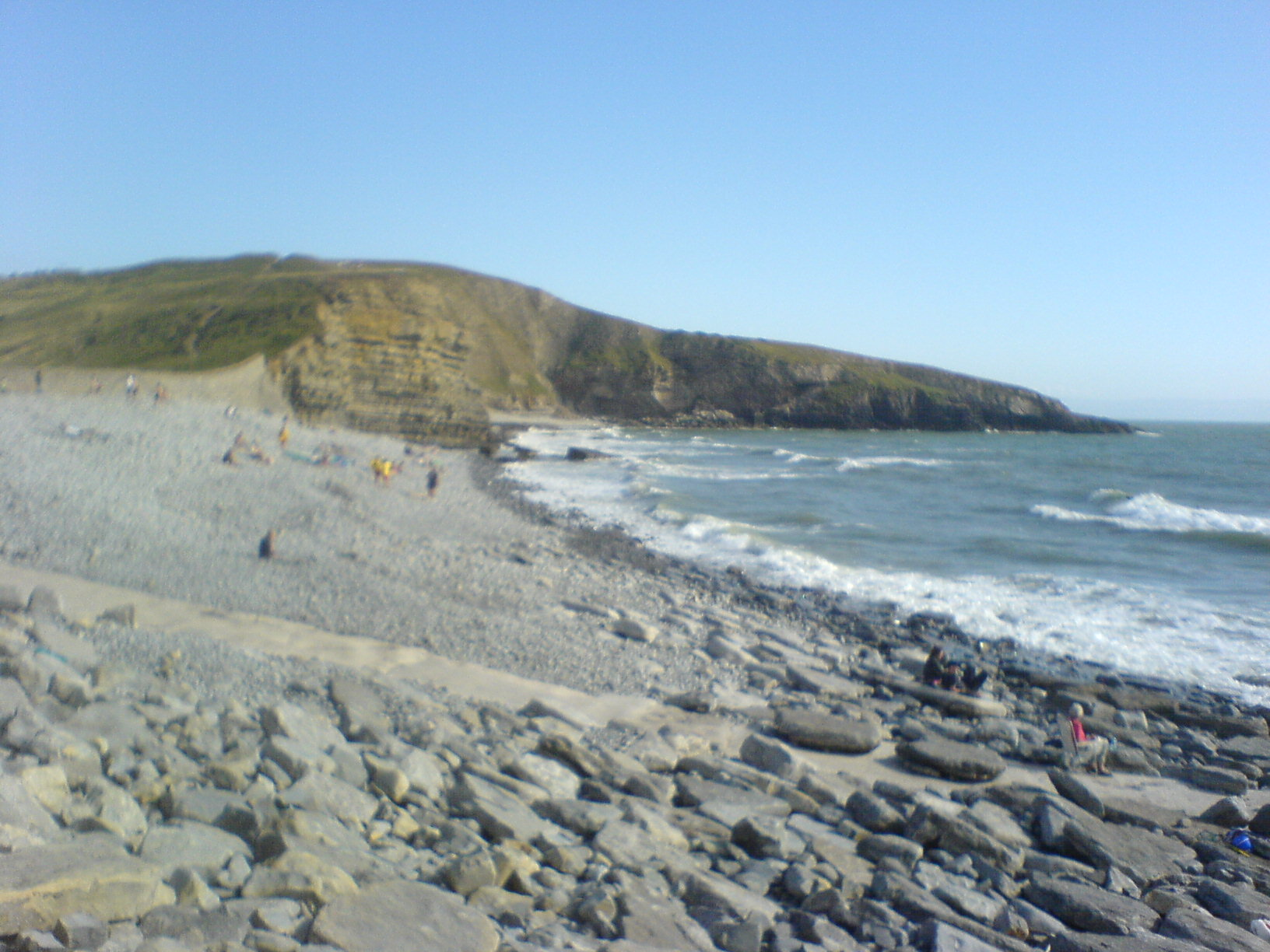
Southerndown beach

Located immediately to the west of Cardiff between the M4 motorway and the Severn Estuary, the county borough of Vale of Glamorgan covers 33,097 hectares (130 square miles) and has 53 km (33 mi) of coastline. The physiographical district from which the modern administrative area derives its name is the slightly larger, generally low-lying area which extends from the River Kenfig in the west, eastwards as far as the Rhymney. The Pennant Sandstone scarp forms its northern boundary. The largest centre of population in the borough is Barry (51,502 inhabitants). Other towns include Cowbridge (6,180), Dinas Powys (7,799), Llantwit Major (10,621) and Penarth (22,083). Much of the population inhabits villages, hamlets and individual farms. The area is low-lying, with a maximum height of 137.3 metres (450 ft) above sea level at Tair Onen to the east of Cowbridge.

The borough borders Cardiff to the north east, Rhondda Cynon Taf to the north, Bridgend to the north west and the Bristol Channel to the south.

The yellow-grey cliffs on the Glamorgan Heritage Coast (which stretches between Gileston and Ogmore-by-Sea) are unique on the Celtic Sea coastline (i.e. Cornwall, Wales, Ireland and Brittany) as they are formed of a combination of Liassic limestone, shale and Carboniferous Limestone. The rocks were formed between 360 and 200 million years ago when the whole area lay underneath a warm, shallow sea at the start of the Jurassic period. Thus today the cliffs contain traces of Jurassic sea creatures, such as ammonites. The calcium carbonate (limestone) in the soil allows crops to be grown which would be difficult elsewhere in Wales. The Liassic limestone and Carboniferous Limestone are also used in the Vale as building materials; in previous centuries it was taken by sloops across the Bristol Channel to North Cornish ports such as Bude, Boscastle and Port Isaac to fertilise Cornwall's poor slate soils; the hard Devonian slate was brought back from Cornwall as a roofing material for houses in the Vale.

As the Glamorgan Heritage Coast faces westwards out to the Atlantic, it bears the brunt of onshore (westerly and south-westerly) winds: ideal for surfing, but a nuisance for ships sailing up the Bristol Channel to Cardiff. As in North Cornwall and South-West Ireland, the fierce Atlantic gales created ideal conditions for deliberate shipwrecking, which until 100 years ago was very common along the coast. Nash Point, Southerndown and Ogmore-by-Sea have some of the highest shipwreck victims on the coast of Wales; as recently as 1962 an oil tanker, the BP Driver, crashed into Nash Point during a violent westerly storm, was torn to shreds by the reefs and eventually sank, although the crew were saved by various Bristol Channel lifeboats and helicopters.

== Economy ==
The Vale of Glamorgan was determined to be the wealthiest area in Wales in a 2003 survey conducted by Barclays Bank that measured disposable income. Chemical industries are located to the east of the port of Barry while further inland the main activity is agriculture, especially beef and dairy cattle, with marketing facilities at Cowbridge.

== Government ==
The Vale of Glamorgan UK Parliament constituency (which do not include Penarth and Sully which are in the constituency of Cardiff South and Penarth) sway between Labour control and Conservative Party control in Westminster. The UK parliament constituency was created in 1983 and the similar Welsh Assembly (later Senedd) constituency in 1999. There is substantial Labour support in the east of the constituency and in the town of Barry, and substantial Conservative support in the agricultural area in the west.

Since the 2026 Senedd election, the county borough spans the two Senedd constituencies of Caerdydd Penarth and Pen-y-bont Bro Morgannwg.

Since 1996, the local government is led by the Vale of Glamorgan Council. The Labour Party initially held a large majority, though the Conservatives were the largest group between 1999 and 2012. Since 2017, there has been no overall political majority on council.

=== Communities ===
All except one (Rhoose) of the Vale's communities elects a community (or town) council, the lowest tier of local government.

- Barry (town)
- Colwinston
- Cowbridge with Llanblethian (town)
- Dinas Powys
- Ewenny
- Llanmaes
- Llancarfan
- Llandough
- Llandow
- Llanfair
- Llangan
- Llantwit Major (town)
- Michaelston-le-Pit and Leckwith
- Penarth (town)
- Pendoylan
- Penllyn
- Peterston-super-Ely
- Rhoose
- St Athan
- St Bride's Major
- St Donats
- St Georges-super-Ely
- St Nicholas with Bonvilston
- Sully and Lavernock
- Welsh St Donat's
- Wenvoe
- Wick

== Villages and hamlets ==
- Aberthaw
- Aberthin
- Broughton
- Bonvilston
- Boverton
- Clawdd Coch
- Clemenstone
- Colwinston
- Corntown
- Culverhouse Cross
- Dinas Powys
- Downs
- Drope
- Dyffryn
- Eglwys Brewis
- Ewenny
- Flemingston
- Fonmon
- Font-y-Gary
- Frampton
- Gileston
- Goldsland
- Graig Penllyn
- Great Hamston
- Gwern-y-Steeple
- Kenson
- Lavernock
- Lidmore
- Llampha
- Llanmaes
- Llanbethery
- Llancadle
- Llancarfan
- Llandough (near Cowbridge)
- Llandough (near Penarth)
- Llandow
- Llangan
- Llanmihangel
- Llansannor
- Llantrithyd
- Llantwithyn
- Llysworney
- Maendy
- Marcross
- Michaelston-le-Pit
- Middlecross
- Moulton
- Newton
- Northcliff
- Nurston
- Ogmore
- Ogmore-by-Sea
- Pancross
- Pendoylan
- Penmark
- Pentre Meyrick
- Peterston-super-Ely
- Pen-y-Lan
- Picketston
- Prisk
- Rhoose
- Sigingstone
- St. Andrews Major
- St Brides Major
- Southerndown
- St Athan
- St Donat's
- St Georges-super Ely
- St Hilary
- St Mary Church
- St Mary Hill
- St. Nicholas
- St Lythans
- Sully
- Sutton
- The Herberts
- Tre-Aubrey
- Tredodridge
- Treguff
- Trerhyngyll
- Twyn-yr-Odyn
- Walterston
- Welsh St Donat's
- Wenvoe
- Wick
- Wrinstone
- Ystradowen

== Sport ==
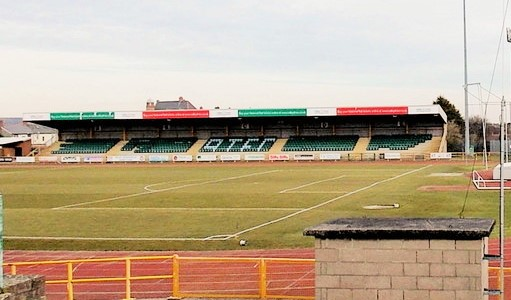
Jenner Park Stadium

The principal football club in the Vale is Barry Town United F.C., of the Cymru Premier who play their home games at Jenner Park Stadium in Barry. The club was founded in 1912 and enjoyed success in the 1990s, when they won the League of Wales and the Welsh Cup. The club experienced declining fortunes in the following decade and were relegated to Welsh Football League Division Two, but were promoted to Division One after winning the league in the 2014–15 season. In 2014 it was announced that Jenner Park stadium would undergo a £350,000 plus development with the laying of a synthetic pitch. There are several other smaller football clubs in the county such as Llantwit Major F.C., established in 1962, which competes in the Cymru South, and Penarth Town AFC in the Vale of Glamorgan League.

Rugby has a strong presence in the county, though none of its clubs compete in the higher leagues. As of the 2015–6 season, Penarth RFC competes in the WRU Division Three South East, Llantwit Major RFC in WRU Division Four South East, and Old Penarthians RFC and Cowbridge RFC in the WRU Division Five South East. Several of the clubs are feeders for Cardiff Blues. There are cricket grounds in Cowbridge and Sully and several golf clubs, including the Glamorganshire, Southerndown and Wenvoe Castle clubs.

== Transport ==
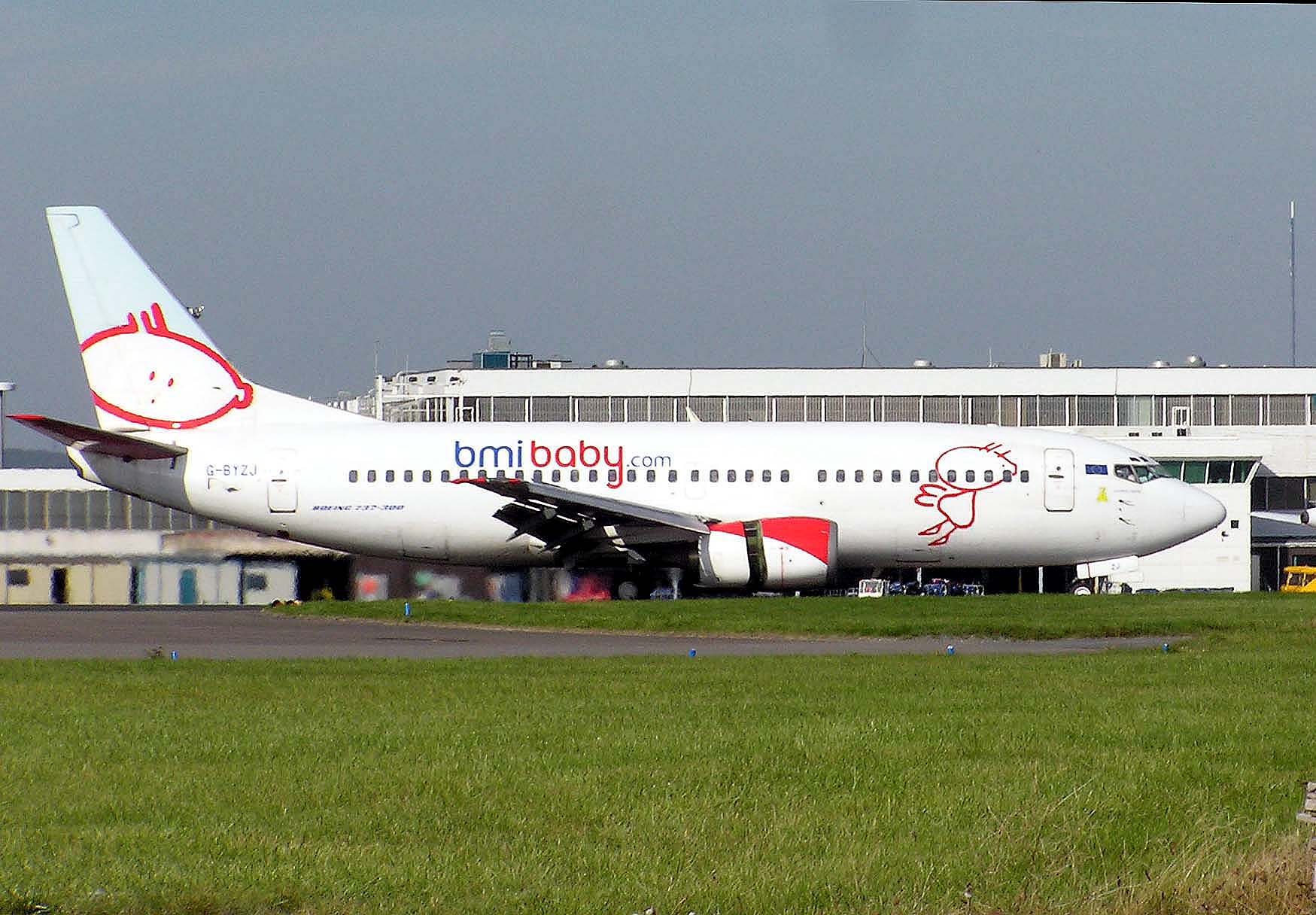
Bmibaby launched operations from Cardiff Airport in 2002 then closed in 2011

=== Road ===
Owing to its close proximity to Cardiff, most of the major roads in the county borough originate in the capital.

Running east–west, the A48 runs through the centre portion of the Vale of Glamorgan between Cardiff and Bridgend, passing along the northern edge of Cowbridge. The M4 motorway also runs east–west along the northern edge of the Vale, linking the area to major cities such as London, Bristol, Newport, and Swansea. Junctions 33 (Cardiff West) and 34 (Llantrisant) provide direct access to the Vale of Glamorgan.

The M4 is economically important to the county borough as it "facilitates the movements of goods and people" from the region to other areas of the UK, enabling local firms "access to domestic and international markets." The county borough benefits from its location in the M4 technology corridor, according to the Welsh Government.

=== Rail ===
The Vale of Glamorgan Line is the county borough's principal rail connection. The line runs between Cardiff Central and Bridgend, with spurs to Barry Island and Penarth. All services on the line are operated by Transport for Wales, linking the Vale directly to other areas of the capital region, including Cardiff Queen Street, Pontypridd, and Merthyr Tydfil. Railway stations in the Vale of Glamorgan are:

- Barry Docks
- Barry Island
- Barry
- Cadoxton
- Cogan
- Dinas Powys
- Dingle Road
- Eastbrook
- Llantwit Major
- Penarth
- Rhoose Cardiff International Airport

The South Wales Main Line passes through the Vale, but trains do not stop. The nearest stations on the South Wales Main Line are (from east to west): Cardiff Central; Pontyclun; Llanharan; Pencoed; Bridgend. Most services are operated by Transport for Wales, but Bridgend and Cardiff are additionally served by Great Western Railway services between Swansea and London Paddington. Cardiff Central is further served by Great Western Railway services to destinations in South West England and CrossCountry services to the Midlands.

The Barry Tourist Railway is a short heritage railway and museum on Barry Island.

=== Bus ===
Bus services in the Vale of Glamorgan are principally operated by New Adventure Travel (NAT) and Cardiff Bus.

The Vale of Glamorgan Council operates a community 'on-demand' transport service in rural communities called Greenlinks.

=== Air ===
Cardiff Airport is in the Vale of Glamorgan, near Rhoose.

In 2019, Cardiff Airport claimed to have a £135 million direct economic benefit to the region. Destinations from Cardiff Airport at the time included Alicante, Amsterdam, Anglesey, Dublin, and Doha. A "Masterplan" for the airport sets out the Welsh Government's ambition to grow the airport's passenger numbers and freight operations by 2040.

MOD St Athan is also situated in the Vale of Glamorgan.

== International links ==
The Vale of Glamorgan is twinned with:

- Rheinfelden, Germany
- Mouscron/Moeskroen, Belgium
- Fécamp, France

and has friendship agreements with:

- Jurbarkas, Lithuania
- Neumarkt/Egna, Italy
- Putnok, Hungary

== Freedom of the Borough ==
The following people and military units have received the Freedom of the Borough of the Vale of Glamorgan.

=== Individuals ===
- Sir Raymond Gower: 13 April 1977.
- Sir Cennydd Traherne: 19 March 1984.
- Sir Hugo Boothby: 19 March 1984.
- Susan Eva Williams: 4 March 1991.

=== Military units ===
- RAF St Athan: 18 May 1974.
- Merchant Navy Association (Wales): 16 April 2005.
- The Welsh Guards: 16 March 2006.
- The Royal Welsh: 21 February 2009.
- 203 (Welsh) Field Hospital (Volunteers) RAMC: 17 April 2010.
- HMS Cambria, RN: 31 March 2012.

== Demographics ==
=== Ethnicity ===
As of the 2021 United Kingdom census, the county borough's ethnic groups are as follows:

| Ethnic group | Percentage |
|---|---|
| White | 94.6% |
| Mixed | 2.3% |
| Asian | 2.1% |
| Black | 0.5% |
| Other | 0.5% |

=== Religion ===
As of the 2021 United Kingdom census, the county borough's religious make-up is as follows:

| Religion | Percentage |
|---|---|
| No religion | 47.9% |
| Christianity | 44.1% |
| Islam | 0.9% |
| Other | 0.5% |
| Hinduism | 0.3% |
| Buddhism | 0.3% |
| Sikhism | 0.1% |
| Judaism | 0.1% |
| not stated | 5.7% |

== See also ==
- List of places in Vale of Glamorgan for all villages and towns.
- List of schools in the Vale of Glamorgan
- Bibliography of the Vale of Glamorgan – list of books and reference material for further reading
