= Peterston-super-Ely =

Peterston-super-Ely: Welsh: Llanbedr-y-fro
- Location within the Vale of Glamorgan
- Population: 874 (2011)
- OS grid reference: ST083764
- Community: Peterston-super-Ely
- Principal area: Vale of Glamorgan
- Preserved county: Vale of Glamorgan
- Country: Wales
- Sovereign state: United Kingdom
- Post town: CARDIFF
- Postcode district: CF5
- Dialling code: 01446
- Police: South Wales
- Fire: South Wales
- Ambulance: Welsh
- UK Parliament: Vale of Glamorgan
- Senedd Cymru – Welsh Parliament: South Wales Central
- List of places UK Wales Vale of Glamorgan 51.4794°N 3.3206°W Map of the community

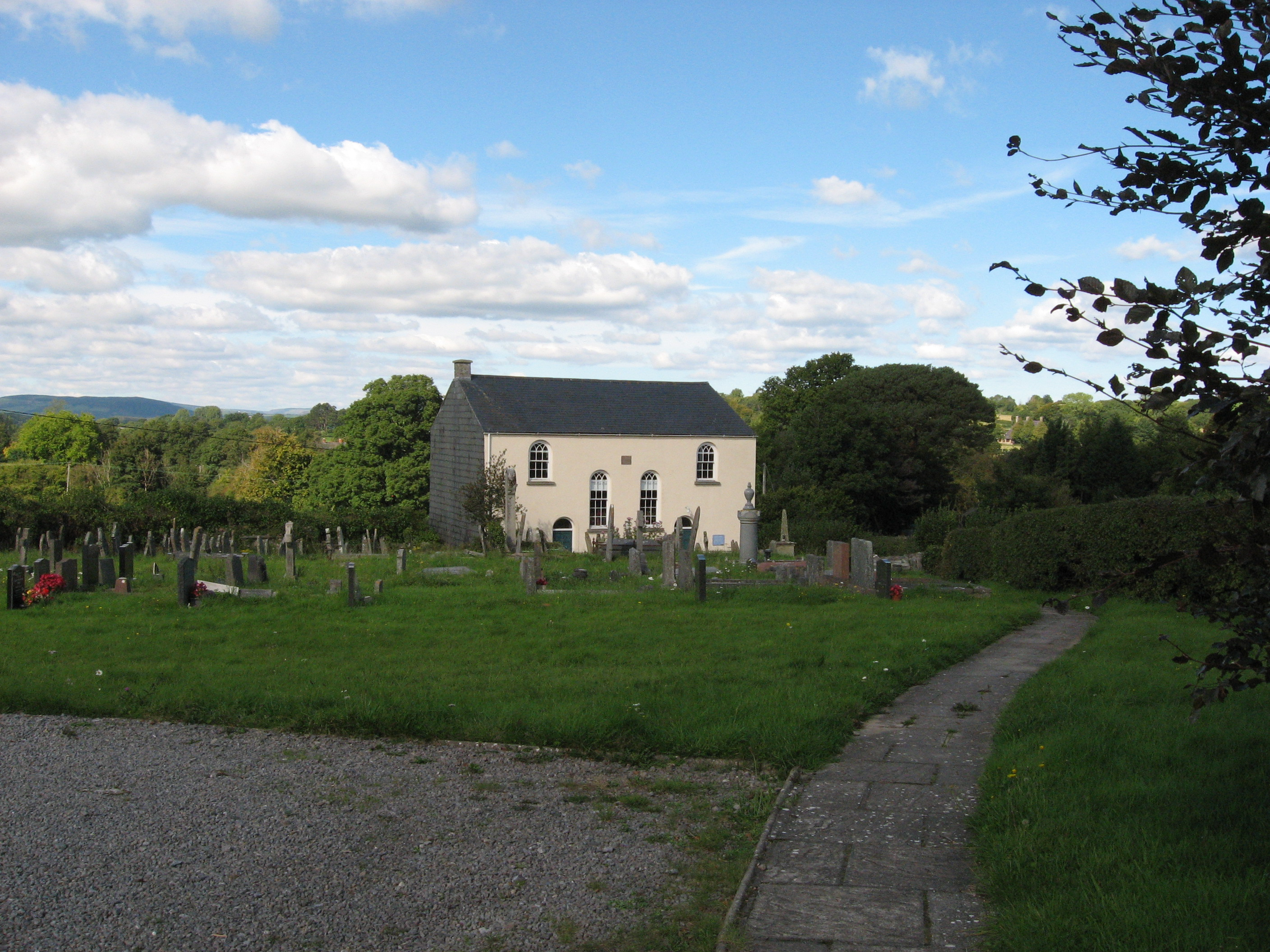
Croes-y-parc Chapel Peterston-Super-Ely

Peterston-super-Ely (Welsh: Llanbedr-y-fro) is a village and community situated on the River Ely (Welsh: Afon Elái) in the county borough of the Vale of Glamorgan, Wales. The community population at the 2011 census was 874. The community includes the hamlet of Gwern-y-Steeple.

== History ==
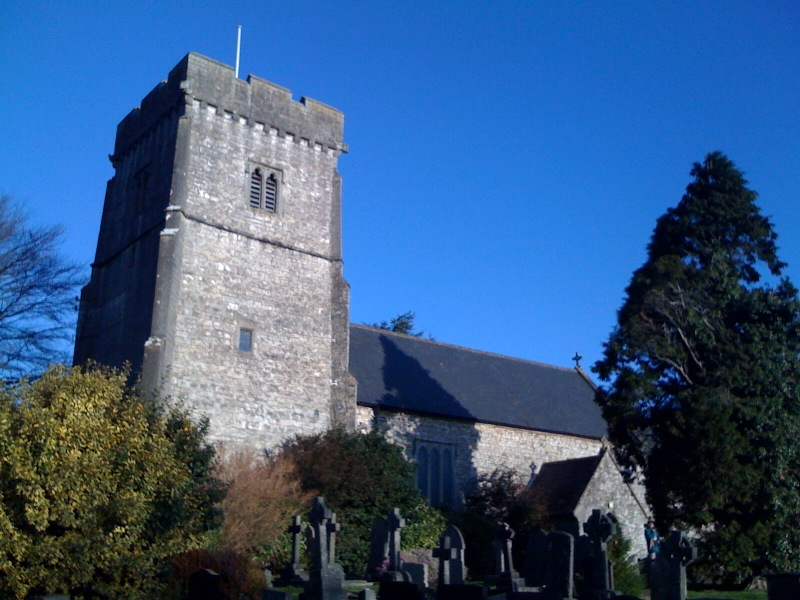
St. Peter's Church Peterston-Super-Ely

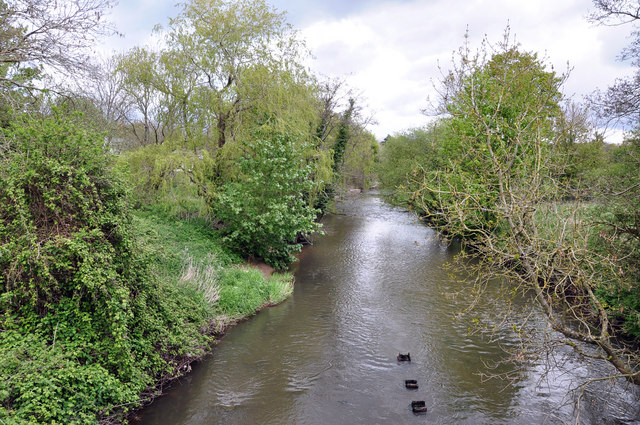
River Ely near Peterston-super-Ely

As its name suggests, the local parish church, now in heavily restored simple Perpendicular style, is dedicated to Saint Peter and situated close to the River Ely (Welsh: Afon Elái). In the conservation area, the oldest structure is what remains of Peterston Castle built by the Norman lords of the manor, Le Sor family, probably in the mid-13th century and replacing an earlier structure which had been destroyed by the Welsh and again by Owain Glyndŵr in 1403. Despite being a scheduled monument, the castle remains have been progressively destroyed by housing development.

The earliest feature of St. Peter's Church is the 14th-century chancel arch but the church is more notable for its Perpendicular style tower. The west tower with its corbelled battlements and gargoyles is 15th century. The chancel was mostly rebuilt in 1890-91 by Kempson & Fowler. From the medieval period until the 19th century, the settlement was a small rural community with the majority of its inhabitants deriving an income from agriculture. Major change arrived with the construction of the railway (opened 1850) and the opening of a railway station west of the village in the second half of the 19th century. A comparison of the pre-railway Tithe Map of c. 1840 with the First Edition Ordnance Survey of c.1880 shows that the railway required a slight re-alignment of the through road giving rise to the unusual alignment of properties south of the railway bridge. The train station closed in 1971 and demolished. During the immediate post-railway period a school was built south of the church.

The Old Rectory was built in 1857 and the chancel of St. Peter's Church was largely reconstructed. It has been suggested that the higher roots of the older yews in the churchyard indicate that the churchyard was cleared in the 19th century. In the early 20th century John and Reginald Cory, coal magnates, began Glyn Cory Garden Village to the south of, and quite separate from, the historic village, now known as Wyndham Park. It was the first garden suburb in Wales. Main Avenue was, and remains, a wide and straight spine road uphill from a bridge over the river. The road originally crossed the river on the site of today's footbridge but is now re-directed westwards along Wyndham Park Way. The former mill is now a private residence. The church's lynch gate is dedicated to those who fell in the Great War. The cost of the playing fields was deferred by grateful parishioners following the 1939-1945 War.

Further housing development took place in the late 20th century adding to the settlement's population and thereby helping the village to continue to support a village shop and school. The Peterston Church in Wales Primary School has about 180 pupils.

== Amenities ==
Entering the village from the east, the village primary school is on the right; the Three Horse Shoes pub is on the left. Past the pub, is the village shop and post office, the local BT telephone exchange, the church and the railway bridge over the South Wales Main Line from Swansea to Cardiff Central and London Paddington. The Sportsmans Rest, a freehold pub, is on the right.

In 2009, the church was an outdoor and indoor filming location for the third series of Gavin & Stacey. Local residents were used as extras.

The village pub was used as the exterior shot for the Deri Arms in the S4C series Pobol Y Cwm.

The memorial park is opposite the church. The playing fields are used by the Peterston Juniors Football Club and the local tennis club. The tennis club contains three modern all-weather courts and youth community coaching is available. A community playground was erected in 1975 and upgraded to modern standards in 2013 by local residents through fundraising. In 2019, the tennis courts at the south-western end of the playing fields were converted to a multi-use-games area, created for the use by local sports clubs and for residents alike. This is managed by the Peterston Sports and Social Club. Peterston-super-Ely is an outdoor filming location for the Welsh language soap opera, Pobol y Cwm.

== Governance ==
The Peterston-super-Ely Community Council is elected by the community. As of 2017, the council comprises eight Independent councillors with no political affiliation. Four of these have been co-opted onto the council.

Peterston-Super-Ely is included in a Peterson-super-Ely electoral ward with a representative on the Vale of Glamorgan Council. The local county councillor is Michael Morgan.

The Member of Parliament (MP) is Kanishka Narayan.

== Notable people ==
- Dafydd William (1720–1794), Welsh hymn-writer
- Neil Kinnock, former resident, former Labour Party leader and later European Commissioner
- Glenys Kinnock (1944–2023), British peer and politician, wife to Neil Kinnock
- Craig Bellamy, Cardiff City FC and Wales international footballer
- Dave Jones, former Cardiff City FC manager
- Angharad Mair, television presenter
- Gwyn Thomas, resident 1965–1981, short-story writer, novelist and dramatist
- Katy Wix, actress and comedian, raised in Peterson-super-Ely

== See also ==
- Gwern-y-Steeple
