= Llancarfan =

Village in Vale of Glamorgan, Wales

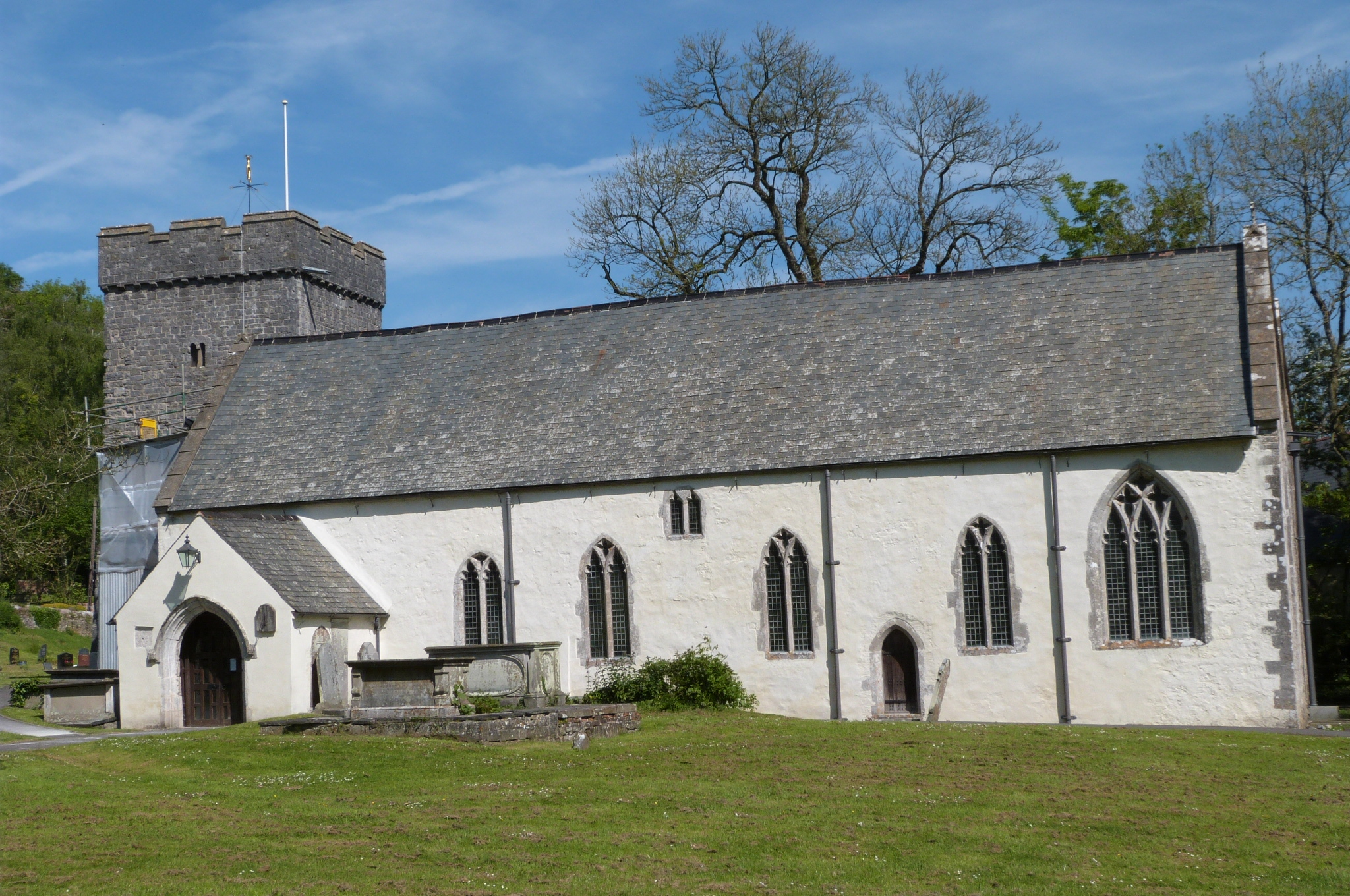
- The parish church of Saint Cadoc

- Location within the Vale of Glamorgan
- Population: 747 (2011)
- OS grid reference: ST051701
- Community: Llancarfan
- Principal area: Vale of Glamorgan
- Preserved county: South Glamorgan
- Country: Wales
- Sovereign state: United Kingdom
- Post town: BARRY
- Postcode district: CF62
- Post town: COWBRIDGE
- Postcode district: CF71
- Police: South Wales
- Fire: South Wales
- Ambulance: Welsh
- UK Parliament: Vale of Glamorgan
- Senedd Cymru – Welsh Parliament: Vale of Glamorgan
- List of places UK Wales Vale of Glamorgan 51.4242°N 3.3656°W Map of the community

Llancarfan is a rural village and community in the Vale of Glamorgan, Wales. The village, located west of Barry and near Cowbridge, has a well-known parish church, the site of Saint Cadoc's 6th-century clas, famed for its learning. Cainnech of Aghaboe, Caradoc of Llancarfan and many other Welsh holy men studied there. Antiquarian Iolo Morganwg was born in the hamlet of Pen-onn near Llancarfan. At the 2001 census, the community had a population of 736. In the 2011 census, the population was 747. Most of the village lies within a conservation area designated by the local authority in 1971. Buildings listed as being of special historic interest include The Fox and Hounds public house, the former Bethlehem Chapel, the former Wesleyan Chapel, Chapel Cottage, Great House, Corner House and Llancarfan Primary School. The community includes village of Moulton.

The spacious church, which in the later Middle Ages belonged to Gloucester Abbey, contains a stoup and interesting remains of a rood screen, now adapted as a reredos. In early 2008, architects discovered medieval wall painting in the church under layers of whitewash, including one of only three depictions of St George to be found in churches in Wales. Conservation-restoration work to reveal the entire mural was completed in 2013.

The community forms half of the Rhoose electoral ward for elections to the Vale of Glamorgan Council.
