= South Glamorgan =

Preserved county of Wales, United Kingdom

Coordinates: 51.499°N 3.330°W

South Glamorgan Welsh: De Morgannwg
- South Glamorgan shown within Wales as a preserved county
- Area
  - 2003: 475 km^{2}
  - 2024: 472 km²
- Population
  - 2024: 519,662
- History
  - Created: 1974
  - Abolished: 1996
  - Succeeded by: Cardiff; Vale of Glamorgan; Preserved county of South Glamorgan
- Status: Non-metropolitan county (1974–1996) Preserved county (1996–)
- Chapman code: SGM
- Government: South Glamorgan County Council
  - HQ: County Hall, Butetown, Cardiff
- Subdivisions
  - Type: Non-metropolitan districts
  - Units: 1. City of Cardiff; 2. Vale of Glamorgan

South Glamorgan (Welsh: De Morgannwg) is a preserved county of Wales.

It was originally formed in 1974 under the Local Government Act 1972, as a county council area. It consisted of the county borough of Cardiff along with the southern part of the administrative county of Glamorgan, and also the parish of St Mellons from Monmouthshire.

These areas were divided between two districts: Cardiff and Vale of Glamorgan. Of the counties created in the Act, this was an unusually low number of districts, with the Isle of Wight in England being the only other county with two. As well as Cardiff, the county included the main towns of Barry, Cowbridge, Llantwit Major and Penarth.

Local government of the county was shared, sometimes in conflict, between South Glamorgan County Council, Cardiff City Council and the Vale of Glamorgan Borough Council.

Following the Local Government (Wales) Act 1994, South Glamorgan was abolished on 1 April 1996, with both district councils becoming unitary authorities. These new authorities each also included small parts of Mid Glamorgan, with Wick, St Brides Major, and Ewenny transferred to the Vale of Glamorgan from the Ogwr district, while Pentyrch and Creigiau (from the Taff-Ely district) became part of Cardiff. At the same time the administrative county was abolished, it became a preserved county which subsequently incorporated the areas that both Cardiff and the Vale of Glamorgan received from Mid Glamorgan and its boundaries remained unchanged since its formation in 1996.

South Glamorgan continues in existence as a preserved county for purposes such as lieutenancy, and as such includes those communities.
