= Grade I listed buildings in the Vale of Glamorgan =

The Vale of Glamorgan shown within Wales

There are 33 Grade I listed buildings in the Vale of Glamorgan all of which are churches and priory buildings, castles, country or manor houses and associated structures such as churchyard crosses and a dovecote.

The Vale of Glamorgan is a county borough in Wales. In the United Kingdom, the term listed building refers to a building or other structure officially designated as being of special architectural, historical, or cultural significance; Grade I structures are those considered to be "buildings of exceptional interest". Listing was begun by a provision in the Town and Country Planning Act 1947. Once listed, strict limitations are imposed on the modifications allowed to a building's structure or fittings. In Wales, the authority for listing under the Planning (Listed Buildings and Conservation Areas) Act 1990 rests with Cadw.

== Buildings ==
Name	Location Grid Ref. (Note: Sometimes known as OSGB36, the grid reference is based on the British national grid reference system used by the Ordnance Survey.) Geo-coordinates	Date Listed	Function	Notes	Reference Number	Image
Ewenny Priory Church	Ewenny; SS9125777813; 51°29′20″N 3°34′03″W	26 July 1963	Church	The E part of the surviving Priory complex, on the S bank of the Ewenny River, NE of Ewenny village and due N of Corntown, bordered by Ewenny Priory (house) gardens to S and churchyard N.	11250	See more images
Church of St Michael	Ewenny Priory; SS9124277808; 51°29′19″N 3°34′04″W	26 July 1963	Church	The W part of the surviving Priory church, on the E side of the Priory complex, on S bank of Ewenny River, NE of Ewenny Village and N of Corntown.	11251	See more images
West Precinct Wall at Ewenny Priory (house)	Ewenny; SS9112177726; 51°29′17″N 3°34′10″W	3 March 1998	Wall	West of Ewenny Priory and just south of Ewenny River, bordering the lane and now enclosing part of Ewenny Priory (house) garden.	19460	See more images
North Gatehouse at Ewenny Priory (house)	Ewenny; SS9114877809; 51°29′19″N 3°34′09″W	3 March 1998	Gatehouse	Facing Abbey Road and Ewenny River, within the Priory complex on NW side.	19462	See more images
Romanesque gateway in former E precinct wall at Ewenny Priory (house)	Ewenny; SS9129377793; 51°29′19″N 3°34′02″W	3 March 1998	Gateway	Set in stretch of original medieval precinct wall on E side of Ewenny Priory (house) garden.	19466	Upload Photo
North tower and attached stretch of precinct wall at Ewenny Priory (house)	Ewenny; SS9119677834; 51°29′20″N 3°34′07″W	3 March 1998	Tower	On the north side of the Priory complex, facing Abbey Road and Ewenny River, close to the Priory churchyard and backing onto the Stable Court of Ewenny Priory house.	19470	See more images
South Gatehouse at Ewenny Priory (house)	Ewenny; SS9117577712; 51°29′16″N 3°34′08″W	3 March 1998	Gatehouse	At the S boundary of Ewenny Priory garden adjoining the parkland S and the precinct wall W.	19471	See more images
Llanmihangel Place	Llandow; SS9811571947; 51°26′14″N 3°28′02″W	16 December 1952	Manor House	Located to the north of the Parish Church, approximately three miles south of Cowbridge.	13136	See more images
Llansannor Court	Llansannor; SS9935077460; 51°29′14″N 3°27′04″W	16 December 1952	House	In the centre of Llansannor village beside the Church of St. Senwyr.	13137	See more images
Nash Manor	Llandow; SS9623872932; 51°26′45″N 3°29′40″W	16 December 1952	Manor House	A multi-period country house 1km south of Llysworney	13138	Upload Photo
Church of St John the Baptist	Llanblethian; SS9850174028; 51°27′22″N 3°27′44″W	22 February 1963	Church	To N and above village in large churchyard.	13144	See more images
Church of St Michael and All Angels	Colwinston; SS9396475396; 51°28′03″N 3°31′41″W	22 February 1963	Church	At the west end of Colwinston village.	13161	See more images
Church of St Senwyr	Llansannor; SS9936777509; 51°29′15″N 3°27′03″W	22 February 1963	Church	In the centre of Llansannor village about 4 km north of Cowbridge.	13162	See more images
St Tathan's Church	St Athan; ST0170168003; 51°24′09″N 3°24′52″W	22 February 1963	Church	In the centre of St Athan village.	13166	See more images
Old Beaupre Castle	Llanfair; ST0090672024; 51°26′19″N 3°25′37″W	22 February 1963	Castle	Located approximately 2km SW of St Hilary on the E bank of the river Thaw, set on a platformed site, with pedestrian access from St Hilary to St Mary Church road to NW, opposite Howe Mill Farm.	13171	See more images
Dovecote at Cadoxton Court	Barry; ST1276968808; 51°24′42″N 3°15′20″W	18 September 1962	Dovecote	The largest and best preserved of the medieval dovecots in Glamorgan.	13176	See more images
Church of the Holy Cross	Cowbridge; SS9939574594; 51°27′41″N 3°26′58″W	5 December 1963	Church	To NE of town gate and grammar school.	13187	See more images
St Illtyd's Church	Llantwit Major; SS9662368719; 51°24′29″N 3°29′16″W	22 February 1963	Church	In the centre of Llantwit Major, west of The Square and well below it.	13259	See more images
Church of the Holy Trinity	Marcross, St Donats; SS9209469063; 51°24′37″N 3°33′10″W	22 February 1963	Church	In the centre of Marcross village.	13303	See more images
St Donat's Castle, including entrance bridge	St Donats; SS9343268108; 51°24′07″N 3°32′00″W	16 December 1952	Castle	The castle stands on a rocky outcrop overlooking the Bristol Channel with the terraced gardens descending to the sea on the south side. The village was originally at the gate and round the church but it was moved away in the C19.	13325	See more images
Walls, steps, terraces, pavilion, summerhouses and cottage attached to wall of the Hanging Gardens at St Donat's Castle	St Donats; SS9344768021; 51°24′04″N 3°31′59″W	22 February 1963	Terracing	Stepping down in tiers from the main south front of St Donats Castle towards the sea.	13326	Upload Photo
Church of St Donat	St Donats; SS9336468066; 51°24′06″N 3°32′04″W	22 February 1963	Church	In the bottom of the cwm below the west side of the castle.	13329	See more images
Medieval Cross and associated Slab in the Churchyard of the Church of St Donat	St Donats; SS9336868052; 51°24′05″N 3°32′03″W	22 February 1963		About 10m from the south side of the church.	13330	Medieval Cross and associated Slab in the Churchyard of the Church of St Donat
St Augustine's Church	Penarth; ST1884072040; 51°26′30″N 3°10′09″W	4 April 1989	Church	In walled churchyard on highest part of Penarth Head; entrance close to junction with St Augustine's Place.	13347	See more images
Hensol Castle (including attached courtyard ranges to the north)	Pendoylan; ST0474078949; 51°30′05″N 3°22′26″W	5 February 1993	Castle	Country house set within a landscaped park with lake and tree lined drive.	13482	See more images
Fonmon Castle	Rhoose; ST0473868097; 51°24′14″N 3°22′15″W	14 February 1952	Castle	On the north side of the B4265 but approached via a drive from Fonmon village.	13597	See more images
Castle Farmhouse	St Georges-super-Ely; ST0986776785; 51°28′58″N 3°17′58″W	14 February 1952	Farmhouse	In the centre of the small hamlet of St Georges, which is about 0.5 m from the church; the River Ely runs along the N side.	13600	See more images
St Cadoc's Church	Llancarfan; ST0512470198; 51°25′22″N 3°21′57″W	28 January 1963	Church	Parish church with many surviving medieval features located at centre of the village.	13605	See more images
Church of St Michael	Michaelston-le-Pit; ST1518072981; 51°26′58″N 3°13′19″W	28 January 1963	Church	In the centre of the village, on a steep rise, the churchyard sloping to south.	13612	See more images
Church of St Donat	Welsh St Donats; ST0279076266; 51°28′37″N 3°24′04″W	28 January 1963	Church	In the centre of Welsh St Donats village.	13641	See more images
Coedarhydyglyn including attached outbuildings at rear	St Georges Super Ely; ST1043275137; 51°28′05″N 3°17′27″W	13 September 1994	House	In an elevated position overlooking surrounding parkland and the Vale of Glamorgan beyond; reached by a long drive from the lane to Drope and St Georges which leads off the A48 at Tumbledown.	14864	See more images
Ogmore Castle	St Brides Major; SS8819176969; 51°28′50″N 3°36′41″W	3 March 1999	Castle	Located on the SE side of the River Ewenny, just before it joins the Ogmore River, in the hamlet of Ogmore to the NW of the B4524. A series of stepping stones cross the river at this point.	21793	See more images
Churchyard Cross at Church of St Canna	Llangan; SS9575277814; 51°29′23″N 3°30′10″W	22 July 2003	Churchyard Cross	In the churchyard beside the main path.	81314	See more images

== See also ==
- Grade II* listed buildings in the Vale of Glamorgan
- Listed buildings in the Vale of Glamorgan
- List of scheduled monuments in the Vale of Glamorgan
- Registered historic parks and gardens in the Vale of Glamorgan
