= Grade II* listed buildings in the Vale of Glamorgan =

The Vale of Glamorgan shown within Wales

In the United Kingdom, the term listed building refers to a building or other structure officially designated as being of special architectural, historical, or cultural significance; Grade II* structures are those considered to be "particularly important buildings of more than special interest". Listing was begun by a provision in the Town and Country Planning Act 1947. Once listed, strict limitations are imposed on the modifications allowed to a building's structure or fittings. In Wales, the authority for listing under the Planning (Listed Buildings and Conservation Areas) Act 1990 rests with Cadw.

== Buildings ==
Name	Location Grid Ref. (Note: Sometimes known as OSGB36, the grid reference is based on the British national grid reference system used by the Ordnance Survey.) Geo-coordinates	Date Listed	Function	Notes	Reference Number	Image
Church of St James	Wick; SS9233072180; 51°26′18″N 3°33′02″W	26 July 1963	Church	Located on the N side of Church Street in the centre of Wick Village. Located in a roughly rectangular churchyard.	11221	See more images
Church of St Bridget	St Brides Major; SS8941375010; 51°27′48″N 3°35′36″W	26 July 1963	Church	Set within a polygonal churchyard on the hillside, towards the NW end of St Brides Major.	11226	See more images
Ewenny Priory House	Ewenny; SS9124677776; 51°29′18″N 3°34′04″W	26 July 1963	Church	About 1km northeast of Ewenny village, a five-bay Georgian mansion to south of Ewenny Priory.	11249	See more images
Ewenny Priory Barn	Ewenny; SS9117077815; 51°29′20″N 3°34′08″W	3 March 1998	Barn	Forming part of the north boundary of Ewenny Priory house courtyard, backing onto Abbey Road, just south of Ewenny River and west of the Priory.	19463	Ewenny Priory Barn
Ewenny Priory East Precinct Wall	Ewenny; SS9128977804; 51°29′19″N 3°34′02″W	3 March 1998		Aligned roughly north/south in Ewenny Priory (house) garden, joining churchyard at southeast and former southeast gatehouse.	19465	Upload Photo
Ewenny Priory Southeast Tower	Ewenny; SS9130777755; 51°29′18″N 3°34′01″W	3 March 1998		At the southeast corner of Ewenny Priory (house) lawned garden adjacent to the haha forming the south boundary.	19467	Upload Photo
Ewenny Priory Medieval fishpool	Ewenny; SS9114177725; 51°29′17″N 3°34′09″W	3 March 1998	Fishpond	Circular fishpond in the walled garden in the west part of the Priory complex.	19469	Upload Photo
Flemingston Court Farmhouse	St Athan; ST0169370023; 51°25′14″N 3°24′55″W	16 December 1952	Farmhouse	On the south side of the Churchyard of the Church of St Michael the Archangel.	13130	Upload Photo
Gileston Manor	Gileston (St Athan); ST0176667072; 51°23′39″N 3°24′48″W	16 December 1952	House	In the centre of Gileston village and immediately west of the Church of St Giles.	13131	See more images
Great House (Ty Mawr), Aberthin	Aberthin; ST0107875288; 51°28′04″N 3°25′32″W	16 December 1952	House	In large walled garden about 300m E of centre of Aberthin; on N side of Nant Aberthin.	13132	Great House (Ty Mawr), Aberthin
Llanmaes House	Llan Maes; SS9812569487; 51°24′55″N 3°27′59″W	16 December 1952	House	In the centre of Llanmaes village facing the east end of the Church of St Cattwg.	13134	See more images
Castleton Farmhouse	St Athan; ST0240668376; 51°24′22″N 3°24′16″W	16 December 1952	Farmhouse	About 700m north-east of the Church of St Athan and approached down a cul-de-sac.	13140	Upload Photo
Parish church of St Michael and All Angels, Llanmihangel	Llanmihangel, Llandow; SS9813571886; 51°26′12″N 3°28′01″W	22 February 1963	Church		13141	See more images
Church of St Brise	St Athan; ST0056269124; 51°24′45″N 3°25′52″W	22 February 1963	Church	It is within the boundary fence of RAF St Athan on the south side of a right-angled bend in the road and hidden by trees.	13142	Upload Photo
Church of St Giles	Gileston (St Athan); ST0178767081; 51°23′39″N 3°24′47″W	22 February 1963	Church	In the centre of Gileston village and immediately to the east of Gileston Manor.	13143	See more images
St Quintin's Castle (Llanblethian Castle)	Cowbridge with Llanblethian; SS9891074177; 51°27′27″N 3°27′23″W	22 February 1963	Castle	About 450m NE of Llanblethian church on spur of land above loop in River Thaw.	13146	See more images
Holy Trinity Church	Llandow; SS9423073322; 51°26′56″N 3°31′24″W	22 February 1963	Church		13148	See more images
Church Farmhouse (also known as The Glebe)	Llandow; SS9422673353; 51°26′57″N 3°31′25″W	22 February 1963	Farmhouse	Situated immediately to the NE of the Parish Church of Holy Trinity, in the centre of Llandow village. Set within its own gardens to front and rear, bounded by a low rubble wall.	13149	Upload Photo
Sutton Farmhouse	Llandow; SS9445972320; 51°26′24″N 3°31′12″W	22 February 1963	Farmhouse		13151	Upload Photo
Church of St Cattwg	Llan Maes; SS9807469486; 51°24′55″N 3°28′01″W	22 February 1963	Church	In the centre of Llanmaes village.	13160	See more images
Church of St Brynach	Penllyn; SS9794574610; 51°27′41″N 3°28′13″W	22 February 1963	Church	At the very southern point of the community and about 1.5 km south of Penllyn village.	13164	See more images
Church of St Hilary	St Hilary (Llanfair); ST0161473263; 51°26′59″N 3°25′02″W	22 February 1963	Church		13170	See more images
Old Beaupre Farmhouse	Llanfair; ST0087972050; 51°26′20″N 3°25′39″W	22 February 1963	Farmhouse	Located at the SE corner of Old Beaupre Castle, attached to the E end of the S range of the ruined manor house, aligned on a N/S axis.	13172	Old Beaupre Farmhouse
Church of St Cadoc, Cadoxton	Cadoxton, Barry; ST1299269347; 51°24′59″N 3°15′09″W	18 September 1962	Church		13175	See more images
Church of St Dyfran and St Teilo, Merthyr Dyfan	Merthyr Dyfan, Barry; ST1149569458; 51°25′02″N 3°16′27″W	18 September 1962	Church		13177	See more images
Barry Castle	Barry; ST1008667197; 51°23′48″N 3°17′38″W	18 September 1962	Castle	Remains of a fortified manor dating from circa 1300-1350. At junction of Porth-y-Castell and Park Road, Barry.	13180	See more images
Cowbridge town wall	Cowbridge with Llanblethian; SS9926874618; 51°27′42″N 3°27′05″W	12 May 1963	Town wall	On east side of The Butts, from rear of Mason's Arms, to bastion at southwest angle, thence along north side of Town Mill Road.	13181	See more images
South Gate (Porth y Felin)	Cowbridge with Llanblethian; SS9932774574; 51°27′40″N 3°27′02″W	12 May 1963	Gate	At south end of Church Street.	13183	See more images
Cowbridge Grammar School	Cowbridge with Llanblethian; SS9934974581; 51°27′40″N 3°27′01″W	18 April 1973	Apartments	To south of Parish Church.	13185	See more images
Cowbridge Town Hall	Cowbridge; SS9956874653; 51°27′43″N 3°26′49″W	12 May 1963	Town hall	Prominently sited near the east end of High Street, with rear elevations to Town Hall Square.	13200	See more images
The Great House, Cowbridge	Cowbridge; SS9948574646; 51°27′43″N 3°26′54″W	12 May 1963		16th century L-shaped hall house, two storeys with attic, about 80m east of junction with Church Street.	13221	Upload Photo
Boverton Place including attached bee-boles	Llantwit Major; SS9825868342; 51°24′18″N 3°27′51″W	9 October 1982		On the south side of Boverton village centre.	13245	See more images
Llantwit Major Town Hall	Llantwit Major; SS9673868717; 51°24′29″N 3°29′10″W	22 February 1963	Town hall	In the centre of Llantwit Major.	13248	See more images
Dovecote, Llantwit Major	Llantwit Major; SS9655068603; 51°24′25″N 3°29′19″W	22 February 1963	Dovecote	About 110m south-west of the Church of St Illtud.	13253	See more images
The Gatehouse, Llantwit Major	Llantwit Major; SS9656468661; 51°24′27″N 3°29′19″W	22 February 1963	Gatehouse	About 80m south-west of the Church of St Illtud. The building is on the roadside and is sited near the south-east corner of the "Monastery" field.	13254	The Gatehouse, Llantwit Major
Old Swan Inn, Llantwit Major	Llantwit Major; SS9674368740; 51°24′30″N 3°29′10″W	16 December 1952	Public house	In the centre of Llantwit Major just to the north of The Town Hall.	13260	See more images
Ty-Mawr (or Great House)	Llantwit Major; SS9669269223; 51°24′45″N 3°29′13″W	22 February 1963		About 500m north of the Church of St Illtud at the northern entrance to the town.	13271	Ty-Mawr (or Great House)
St Mary's Church	Monknash, St Donats; SS9210770468; 51°25′23″N 3°33′11″W	22 February 1963	Church	About 200m east of the road junction in the centre of Monknash on the south side of the road going towards St Donats.	13311	See more images
St Peter's Church, Penarth	Penarth; ST1687570568; 51°25′41″N 3°11′49″W	19 November 1990	Church	On east of minor road branching off Sully Road. To north of Cogan Old Hall Farm.	13370	See more images
Whitehouse Cottage	Barry; ST1031566364; 51°23′21″N 3°17′25″W	2 July 1978	House	The oldest inhabited house in Barry, dating from the late 16th century.	13400	Whitehouse Cottage
Llandough Castle	Llandough; SS9947872999; 51°26′49″N 3°26′52″W	13 May 1981	Castle		13408	See more images
The gatehouse, Llandough Castle (including attached boundary walls)	Llanfair; SS9948972975; 51°26′49″N 3°26′52″W	16 December 1952	Gatehouse		13421	The gatehouse, Llandough Castle (including attached boundary walls)
Great House with Forecourt Walls & Gatepiers	Llanblethian; SS9888973935; 51°27′19″N 3°27′24″W	17 May 1988		House dating from circa 1600 with a facade dated 1703, about 100m southwest of bridge over River Thaw.	13424	Great House with Forecourt Walls & Gatepiers
Barn and stable to east of Llanmithangel Place, Llanmithangel	Llandow; SS9819171963; 51°26′15″N 3°27′58″W	19 September 1989	Farm buildings		13436	Upload Photo
Barry Dock Offices	Barry; ST1221867659; 51°24′04″N 3°15′48″W	30 July 1990		Prominently sited, overlooking Docks to the south, below the town on a flat site near Castleisland Point; railway immediately to rear.	13443	See more images
Pedestal and statue of David Davies	Barry; ST1221267615; 51°24′03″N 3°15′48″W	30 July 1990	Statue	Statue of engineer, industrialist and entrepreneur David Davies (1818–1890). On the seaward side of the road in front of Barry Dock Board Offices, overlooking the docks.	13445	See more images
Sully Hospital	Sully; ST1406267522; 51°24′01″N 3°14′12″W	6 November 1990		Reached along a byroad one-and-a-half km southwest from B4267 near west outskirts of Sully. The hospital is sited in extensive, wooded grounds at Hayes Point overlooking the Bristol Channel.	13447	See more images
Dyffryn House	St Nicholas and Bonvilston; ST0953372415; 51°26′37″N 3°18′11″W	15 September 1992		Set within the large public grounds of Dyffryn Gardens; 2km to south of St Nicholas.	13469	See more images
Garnllywd Farmhouse, Lannfythin	Llancarfan; ST0572771280; 51°25′58″N 3°21′27″W	14 February 1952	Farmhouse		13592	Upload Photo
Treguff Farmhouse, Treguff	Llancarfan; ST0308571113; 51°25′51″N 3°23′44″W	14 February 1952	Farmhouse		13593	Upload Photo
Trewallter Fawr Farmhouse	Walterston; ST0688571129; 51°25′53″N 3°20′27″W	28 January 1963	Farmhouse	Set on the east side of the Walterston hamlet to the northeast of the Llancarfan village.	13606	Trewallter Fawr Farmhouse
St Illtyd's parish church, Llantrithyd	Llantrithyd; ST0438572792; 51°26′46″N 3°22′38″W	28 January 1963	Church		13609	See more images
Church of St Cadoc, Pendoylan	Pendoylan; ST0598876685; 51°28′53″N 3°21′19″W	28 January 1963	Church		13613	See more images
The Blue Anchor Inn	Rhoose; ST0350466686; 51°23′28″N 3°23′18″W	28 January 1963	Restaurant	In the centre of East Aberthaw village on the east side of the road.	13614	See more images
St Mary's Church, Penmark	Rhoose; ST0584868847; 51°24′39″N 3°21′19″W	28 January 1963	Church	In the centre of Penmark village on the north side of the road to Barry.	13617	See more images
Church of St Peter, Peterston Super Ely	Peterston Super Ely; ST0826376406; 51°28′45″N 3°19′21″W	28 January 1963	Church	In the village centre set within a large walled rectangular churchyard with entrances at SE and SW.	13618	See more images
St Curig's Church	Porthkerry; ST0823566612; 51°23′28″N 3°19′13″W	28 January 1963	Church	On the eastern boundary of the community set to the south-east of Porthkerry village green.	13619	See more images
Church of St Andrew	St Andrews Major (Dinas Powys); ST1385571467; 51°26′08″N 3°14′26″W	28 January 1963	Church	On low-lying ground in the centre of the rural hamlet (northwest of the urban development of Dinas Powys) standing in a roughly rectangular churchyard with retaining wall incorporating stone stiles.	13625	See more images
The Old Rectory	St Andrews Major (Dinas Powys); ST1385971419; 51°26′07″N 3°14′26″W	28 January 1963	(ex)House	Ex priest's house probably dating back to the 15th century, now used as a garage. Situated southwest of the church, within the grounds of The Rectory and reached by a drive through that property.	13626	See more images
Church of St George, St Georges Super Ely	St Georges Super Ely; ST1045776649; 51°28′54″N 3°17′27″W	28 January 1963	Church	A little to the E of the hamlet of St Georges which developed round Castle Farm, main approach from N, the centre of a small cluster of buildings grouped round the churchyard, close to the Ely River.	13633	See more images
Church of St Bleiddian	Wenvoe; ST1102972921; 51°26′54″N 3°16′54″W	28 January 1963	Church	In the centre of St Lythans hamlet, set back from the road, reached by a short track and surrounded by a roughly circular walled churchyard incorporating stone stiles.	13635	See more images
Parish church of St Nicholas, St Nicholas	St Nicholas; ST0901874367; 51°27′39″N 3°18′40″W	28 January 1963	Church		13636	See more images
Church of St Mary, Wenvoe	Wenvoe; ST1219672690; 51°26′47″N 3°15′53″W	28 January 1963	Church	In the centre of Wenvoe village, fronting the main thoroughfare, in a roughly rectangular churchyard entered through a stone arch at NE.	13643	See more images
Coach-house and stables at Coedarhydyglyn	St Georges Super Ely; ST1049075173; 51°28′06″N 3°17′24″W	13 September 1994		To the NE of the main house, on the same plateau.	14865	Upload Photo
Sliding Bridge at N entrance to Basin	Barry; ST1224167139; 51°23′47″N 3°15′46″W	13 February 1996	Bridge	Spans N entrance to Dock Basin.	16562	Sliding Bridge at N entrance to Basin
Ty Maen	St Brides Major; SS8938777066; 51°28′54″N 3°35′40″W	3 March 1999	House	Located off the S side of the B4524 road which leads from Bridgend to Ogmore-by-Sea. The house is just W of the community boundary with Ewenny, and is cut into the hillside with sharp drops to the N and E.	21775	Upload Photo
Old Leckwith Bridge	Canton / Michaelston; ST1591975226; 51°28′11″N 3°12′43″W	2 December 1952	Bridge	At the S end of Canton crossing the River Ely into Leckwith; at the foot of Leckwith Woods and adjacent to the later bridge carrying the B4267	26487	See more images
Walls, Gatepiers and Gates of Llanmaes House	Llan Maes; SS9810869481; 51°24′55″N 3°28′00″W	21 July 2003	Walls and Gates	Surrounding the front and rear gardens of Llanmaes House.	81305	Walls, Gatepiers and Gates of Llanmaes House
Church of St Michael the Archangel, St Athan	Flemingston, St Athan; ST0169270068; 51°25′16″N 3°24′55″W	9 March 2004	Church	In the centre of Flemingston village.	83115	See more images
Church Farmhouse (aka Glebe Farm)	Rhoose; ST0817966682; 51°23′30″N 3°19′16″W	30 September 2004	Farmhouse	On the north side of the Porthkerry village green about 50m from the Church of St Curig	83147	Church Farmhouse (aka Glebe Farm)
Outbuilding to north of Church Farmhouse	Rhoose; ST0817466700; 51°23′31″N 3°19′16″W	30 September 2004	Farm building	In the garden on the north side of Church Farmhouse.	83157	Outbuilding to north of Church Farmhouse
Watchtower at Fonmon Castle	Rhoose; ST0477867952; 51°24′09″N 3°22′13″W	14 February 1952	Watchtower	About 200m south of Fonmon Castle.	83166	See more images

== See also ==
- Grade I listed buildings in the Vale of Glamorgan
- Listed buildings in the Vale of Glamorgan
- List of scheduled monuments in the Vale of Glamorgan
- Registered historic parks and gardens in the Vale of Glamorgan
