= Registered historic parks and gardens in the Vale of Glamorgan =

List of buildings in county borough of Wales

The Vale of Glamorgan shown within Wales

The Vale of Glamorgan is a county borough in south-east Wales. It covers an area of 331 km^{2} (128 sq mi) and in 2021 the population was approximately 132,500.

The Cadw/ICOMOS Register of Parks and Gardens of Special Historic Interest in Wales was established in 2002 and given statutory status in 2022. It is administered by Cadw, the historic environment agency of the Welsh Government. Elisabeth Whittle described Cadw as having a "somewhat special and guiding role" in the preservation of historic parks and gardens, since they are "an integral part of Welsh archaeological and architectural heritage". The register includes just under 400 sites, ranging from gardens of private houses, to cemeteries and public parks. Parks and gardens are listed at one of three grades, matching the grading system used for listed buildings. Grade I is the highest grade, for sites of exceptional interest; Grade II*, the next highest, denotes parks and gardens of great quality; while Grade II denotes sites of special interest.

There are 18 registered parks and gardens in the Vale of Glamorgan. Two are listed at Grade I, four at Grade II* and 12 at Grade II.

== Key ==
Grade	Criteria
I	Parks and gardens of exceptional interest
II*	Parks and gardens of great quality
II	Parks and gardens of special interest

== List of parks and gardens ==
List of parks and gardens
Name	Location Grid Ref. (Note: Sometimes known as OSGB36, the grid reference is based on the British national grid reference system used by the Ordnance Survey.) Geo-coordinates	Date Listed	Description / Notes	Grade	Reference Number	Image
Alexandra Park	Penarth; ST1867871528; 51°26′11″N 3°10′12″W	1 February 2022	Public park A well-preserved Edwardian public park with terracing and a network of winding paths. The grade II listed war memorial cenotaph was designed by Goscombe John and unveiled on 11 November 1924.	II*	PGW(Gm)37(GLA)	a stone structure in a park
Coedarhydyglyn	St Georges super Ely; ST1025775142; 51°28′04″N 3°17′32″W	1 February 2022	Park, country house garden and kitchen garden The landscape park was laid out at around the same time as the building of the house (1820s). A Japanese-style garden was developed in the early twentieth century. The walled kitchen garden located to the south-west of the house is thought to have been made for the old house (built 1767) that was demolished in 1823.	II*	PGW(Gm)40(GLA)	Coedarhydyglyn
Cold Knap Park	Barry; ST1006266426; 51°23′21″N 3°17′34″W	1 February 2022	Public park The dominant feature of this 1920s park is a boating lake in the shape of a Welsh harp. A promenade runs along the south-west side of the park. The south-east area of the park is the site of a lido that closed in 1996.	II	PGW(Gm)58(GLA)	a path by a lake, both covered by birds, in the background are trees and houses
Cwrt-yr-ala	Michaelston-le-Pit and Leckwith; ST1426273035; 51°26′58″N 3°14′02″W	1 February 2022	Country house garden and kitchen garden Much of the layout of the gardens and grounds relates to a house built in the 1820s. When this was replaced with a neo-Georgian mansion in 1939–40 the gardens took their present form which overlays the earlier layout. The kitchen garden is thought to date to the mid-nineteenth century.	II	PGW(Gm)42(GLA)	Cwrt-yr-ala
Dunraven Park	St Brides Major; SS8895872995; 51°26′40″N 3°35′53″W	1 February 2022	Deer park, country house garden and walled garden The pleasure gardens are probably contemporary with the building of a large gothic mansion in 1802–1806. The walled garden area has undergone several phases of development but have been enclosures here since at least the sixteenth century. The park is thought to date from the seventeenth century. To the west of the house is a coastal headland occupied by the remains of an iron age hillfort.	II	PGW(Gm)4(GLA)	a path leading to an archway through a stone wall
Dyffryn	Wenvoe; ST0946672668; 51°26′43″N 3°18′10″W	1 February 2022	Public park, walled garden and park A partnership between horticulturalist and owner Reginald Cory and landscape architect Thomas Mawson created what Cadw describe as "the grandest and most outstanding Edwardian gardens in Wales". The walled garden is possibly sixteenth or seventeenth century.	I	PGW(Gm)32(GLA)	a strip of grass bordered by many colourful flowers
Ewenny Priory	Ewenny; SS9136777729; 51°29′15″N 3°33′53″W	1 February 2022	Park, country house garden and kitchen garden The landscape gardens ae contemporary with the house built in 1803–1805 within the precinct of a Benedictine priory (founded c. 1141). The kitchen garden was created in the early nineteenth century by the addition of wall to enclose an area bounded on three sides by medieval priory walls. The park, which has its origins as a sixteenth-century deer park, lies mostly to the south of the house and gardens.	II	PGW(Gm)14(GLA)	Ewenny Priory
Fonmon Castle	Rhoose; ST0450468125; 51°24′13″N 3°22′23″W	1 February 2022	Country house garden and kitchen garden The Fonmon Brook runs through a valley in the east of the estate in which there are informal gardens and woodland grounds. The lawns, terraced and walled gardens, which have their origins in the period 1656–1674 but with later modifications, form an attractive setting for the grade I listed medieval castle	II	PGW(Gm)39(GLA)	a stone building covered in greenery, with grass in the foreground
Hensol Castle	Pendoylan; ST0430678832; 51°29′59″N 3°22′44″W	1 February 2022	Park, country house garden and kitchen garden The mid-eighteenth-century landscape park includes a large lake with an island folly. There are wooded grounds at the north of the lake. To the north of the house is the kitchen garden, to its east and west are informal gardens. The formal garden south of the house is post-1927 when the park and house were converted into a hospital.	II	PGW(Gm)41(GLA)	a lawn with a path leading towards a large stone mansion
Italian Gardens	Penarth; ST1878271219; 51°26′01″N 3°10′07″W	1 February 2022	Public park An Edwardian-style public garden laid out and opened in 1926. The garden, which is surrounded by iron railings, consists of two terraces and was designed principally as a rock garden.	II	PGW(Gm)35(GLA)	blue railings in front of a park with colourful flower beds and palm trees
Llanmihangel Place	Llandow; SS9795172055; 51°26′16″N 3°28′06″W	1 February 2022	Garden terrace and former orchard The layout of the gardens, which probably dates to the sixteenth and seventeenth centuries, appears largely unchanged from that recorded in maps of the 1770s. A rubble-built stone wall encloses the main garden. The eastern third is divided into three terraces and the two-thirds of the walled enclosure which was occupied by the orchard is now lightly wooded with a assortment of trees.	II*	PGW(Gm)34(GLA)	a large stone building
Llantrithyd Place	Llancarfan; ST0481173603; 51°27′11″N 3°22′12″W	1 February 2022	Deer park and country house garden The ruined house and gardens, with their complex formal layout of terraces, walks and ponds, date to the mid to late sixteenth century. The exceptionally complete deer park is mid-seventeenth century.	II*	PGW(Gm)43(GLA)	trees and stone walls of a ruined house
Old Beaupre	Llanfiar; ST0083272118; 51°26′20″N 3°25′37″W	1 February 2022	Country house garden The earthwork remains of extensive formal gardens that are contemporary with the rebuilding of the house in second half of the sixteenth century and included terraces, walks and ponds.	II	PGW(Gm)38(GLA)	roofless stone buildings at the top of a grass covered hill
Romilly Park	Barry; ST1009167005; 51°23′40″N 3°17′33″W	1 February 2022	Public park Laid out during the Edwardian period with features including landscaped pathways, a bowling green and tennis courts. In a separate area, to the north of the main park, is a Gorsedd circle unveiled in 1920 when the National Eisteddfod held in Barry.	II	PGW(Gm)63(GLA)	a grass field with several standing stones. In the background is a road and trees
Pwll-yr-wrach	Colwinston; SS9522275409; 51°28′03″N 3°30′31″W	1 February 2022	Country house garden and kitchen garden The Georgian mansion (built c. 1770) is flanked on its east and west by a pair of single-storey pavilions of stone with slate roofs. The walled garden, to the west of the house, is a former kitchen garden and now mostly ornamental.	II	PGW(Gm)44(GLA)	Pwll-yr-wrach
St Donat's Castle	St Donats; SS9323268136; 51°24′06″N 3°32′06″W	1 February 2022	Pleasure garden and terraced garden The former deer parks lie to the east and west of the castle and are probably medieval in origin. The kitchen garden is to the north of the castle. To the south of the castle are terraced gardens originally built in the second half of the sixteenth century. These include a rose garden and a Tudor garden with statues of heraldic animals.	I	PGW(Gm)30(GLA)	a walled garden with stone paths and roses
Wenvoe Castle	Wenvoe; ST1184871245; 51°25′58″N 3°16′06″W	1 February 2022	Park, country house garden and kitchen garden The medium-sized landscape park of about 324 acres (131 ha) was largely created in the mid-eighteenth century. The area to the south of the house is now occupied by the golf course and to the south of this is a large area of deciduous woodland.	II	PGW(Gm)33(GLA)	Wenvoe Castle
Windsor Gardens	Penarth; ST1873071119; 51°25′58″N 3°10′09″W	1 February 2022	Public park The gardens, which were completed in the 1880s, are divided into two sections. They occupy a long narrow strip of land at the top of the cliff above the sea front esplanade. Both sections are laid out and planted in the same style, but there is a bandstand in the northern half.	II	PGW(Gm)36(GLA)	a bandstand in a park

== See also ==
- List of scheduled monuments in the Vale of Glamorgan
- Grade I listed buildings in the Vale of Glamorgan
- Grade II* listed buildings in the Vale of Glamorgan
