= Holy Trinity Church, Marcross =

Church in Marcross, Vale of Glamorgan, Wales

Coordinates: 51.41031°N 3.55290°W

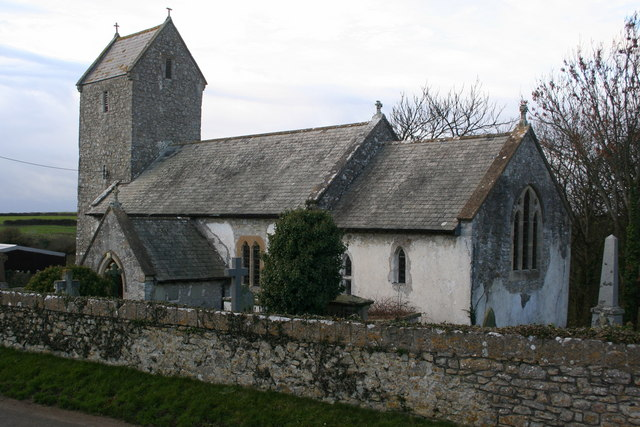
Holy Trinity Church, St Donats

Holy Trinity Church is a Grade I-listed church in Marcross (part of the community of St Donats), a village in the Vale of Glamorgan, south Wales. It received its status as a Grade I-listed building on 22 February 1963.

== Early history ==
The English historian, John Capgrave, wrote that St Cyngar established a monastery in Glamorganshire with 12 canons dedicated to the Holy Trinity. It is believed this was the beginning of Holy Trinity Church. In 1874, the remains of what appeared to be a monastery were still visible. The parish consisted of Marcross Manor, owned by Sir Philip de Marcross from 1189 to 1200. De Marcross' only heir was a daughter; when she married in about 1250, the manor passed to William le Butler. The church was described as a rectory worth five marks in 1254, and was still described as such in 1535. By 1563, it was noted as having a parson and curate; by 1835, while it remained classified as a rectory, the listing for patron was the Chapter of Llandaff. (Note: In this time frame, a new parsonage was built with a loan from Queen Anne's Bounty.)

The church is in the village centre. The main structure dates from the 12th century; it is believed that the tower was added to the building in the 14th century. The tower, with its saddleback roof, may have been partially rebuilt in the 17th century, from evidence of a difference in masonry above its ridge. The rounded Norman arch at the church entrance dates from circa 1150 and the large font with rolled mouldings dates from the 12th century. There are no aisles in either the chancel or nave. One of the chancel walls has two trefoil light windows believed to be from the 13th century. One of these windows may have been used for the ringing of a Sanctus Bell. The building is constructed of stone with slate roofing, with the roof for the chancel being lower than the nave. Still in the chancel is the lepers' window, where those with contagious diseases could view church services without coming into contact with others.

== 19th century to present ==
By the late 19th century, it became evident that the church was in need of restoration work. The rector of Holy Trinity began a fundraising campaign for the work; it took four years to raise the needed funds. By 1892, enough donations were received to allow Kempton and Fowler of Llandaff to begin the project. During the restoration, the architects discovered many items of note which had been hidden by previous renovations to the church. While removing old plaster from the walls, a doorway leading to the rood loft on the north side of the chancel arch was uncovered. The plaster removal also located a 13th-century tomb in a recess of the north nave wall. During the restoration, a tomb in the chancel floor from circa 1200 and the church's original pillar piscina were also located.

When the restoration was completed, the church had been completely re-roofed, the church walls and tower were renovated, new floors were installed along with new pews, a new pulpit and reading desk, as well as a new altar and altar rail. Holy Trinity was reopened on 17 January 1897. The only changes made to the church since this restoration were to remove the pews in favour of chairs for seating. The church appears to now be in need of work, particularly after a series of spring storms in 2016. In May, 2016, a village fundraiser was held at the local pub to help with the necessary costs of repairing the church.

There is also a circa 15th century cross which holds a circa 18th century bronze sundial on the church property; these became Grade II listed buildings on 9 October 1982.
