= Listed buildings in the Vale of Glamorgan =

The Vale of Glamorgan has 740 listed buildings of which 4% are Grade I listed, 10% Grade II* listed and remainder Grade II listed.

Grade II entries are listed below alphabetically by town/village.

== Grade II listed buildings ==
=== Aberthin ===
- Pen-y-Bryn, Pen-y-Lan Road
- Range of Buildings at Court Farm, Llanquian Road
- Gatehouse and Bridge to Great House, Llanquian Road
- The Sweetings (including attached Barn and Stable Range to West)
- Telephone Call-Box outside “Farmers Arms” Public House
- Glamorgan Yeomanry War Memorial, St. Hilary Down

=== Barry and Porthkerry ===
- Watchtower at Watch House Bay
- Rocket Station adjacent to Watch Tower
- No. 10, Old Village Road (Rose Cottage)
- All Saints Church, Park Road
- Porthkerry Methodist Church, Porthkerry Road
- Barry Hotel, Broad Street
- No. 69 High Street
- No. 70 High Street
- No.71 High Street
- No.72 High Street
- Cenotaph, inc. area walls and steps at Gladstone Road
- Former Fire Station, Court Road
- Vale Resource Centre (former Polytechnic of Wales)
- College Fields Nursing Home (former Polytechnic of Wales)
- Springbank Nursing Home (former Polytechnic of Wales)
- Caretaker's Cottage, ‘The Lodge’ former Polytechnic of Wales
- Chapel of former Polytechnic of Wales
- Municipal Buildings inc. library, (aka the Town Hall) King's Square
- Former Church of St. Nicholas
- Cross at former Church of St. Nicholas
- Churchyard wall, former Church of St. Nicholas
- Cross in Churchyard of St. Cadoc's Church
- Cadoxton Court, Mount Pleasant
- No. 1, Coldbrook Road East (The Old Schoolhouse)
- Former Customs House and Mercantile Marine Office, Station Street
- Lamp standard 1 of 6 outside former Barry Dock Offices
- Lamp standard 2 of 6 outside former Barry Dock Offices
- Lamp standard 3 of 6 outside former Barry Dock Offices
- Lamp standard 4 of 6 outside former Barry Dock Offices
- Lamp standard 5 of 6 outside former Barry Dock
- Lamp standard 6 of 6 outside former Barry Dock Offices
- Friars Point House
- Gate and Gatepiers, Friars Point House
- Lodge, Friars Point House
- North Hydraulic Pumping House, Barry No. 1 Dock
- Lifeboathouse adjacent to West Breakwater
- Lifeboathouse slipway adjacent to West Breakwater
- Walls of No. 3 Dock Basin, Barry Docks
- Operators Cabin to Sliding Bridge
- Breakwater Lighthouse, Barry Docks
- Grotto in Wenvoe Castle Park

==== Porthkerry ====
- Porthkerry Viaduct (partly in Rhoose community)
- Lower Porthkerry Farmhouse, Porthkerry Road
- Upper Porthkerry Farmhouse
- Cross in Church of St. Curig
- The Old Schoolhouse - Cottage at West end of Churchyard

=== Bonvilston ===
- Bonvilston Cottage
- Church of St. Mary
- Churchyard Cross at Church of St. Mary
- Village Farmhouse
- Great House (Ty Mawr)

=== Broughton ===
- Monkton Isaf
- Barn with stable at Monkton Isaf

=== Colwinston ===
- Churchyard Cross at Church of St. Michael and All Angels
- Churchyard Wall at Church of St. Michael and All Angels
- The Old Parsonage – S of Church of St. Michael and All Angels
- “The Sages”
- Milepost on Northeast side of A48 opposite Twmpath Farm
- Village House
- Milepost by Crackhill House (A48 Crack Hill)
- Pwllywrach
- East Garden House of Pwll-y- Wrach
- West Garden House of Pwll-y- Wrach

=== Corntown ===
- Former Bethlehem Baptist Church (aka Ty Capel)
- Corntown Court
- Top Lodge
- Village Hall
- Corntown Farmhouse

=== Cowbridge ===
- Nos. 1 - 3, The Butts
- Eastfield, Cardiff Road
- Nos. 6 and 7, Church Street
- Gate and End Piers, Walls, Railings, Gates at West. Entrance to Churchyard
- South-Southeast and Northwest Churchyard Walls
- The Boot House at Grammar School, Church Street
- SE Wall to Former Grammar School Garden, Church Street
- No.18 (East House), Eastgate
- Telephone Call-Box beside Eastgate Mews, Eastgate
- No. 44 (Ancient Druid), Eastgate
- No. 46 (The Armoury), Eastgate
- No. 48 (East Villa), Eastgate
- No. 49 Eastgate
- No. 54 (Heath House), Eastgate
- Nos. 56 and 58, Eastgate
- Telephone Call-Box outside Royal Mail Delivery Office, Eastgate
- No. 66 (Colours), Eastgate
- No. 68 (Eastgate Gallery), Eastgate
- No. 70, Eastgate
- Nos. 71 & 73, Eastgate
- No. 77 Eastgate
- No. 79 (Citizens’ Advice Bureau)
- No. 1 (‘Aberthaw’/ ‘Glanthaw’) including forecourt wall and railings), High Street
- No. 16 High Street
- No. 18 High Street
- No. 20 High Street
- No. 22 High Street
- No. 23 High Street
- Water Pump against SE Elevation of No. 23, High Street
- Telephone Call-Box outside No. 23, High Street
- No. 26 High Street
- No. 27 High Street
- Mounting Block attached to Nos. 25 & 27 High Street
- No. 28 (Principality Building Society), High Street
- No. 29 High Street
- No. 30 (Ogmore Vale Bakery), High Street
- No. 31 High Street
- No. 33 (Lloyds Bank), High Street
- Former Coach House to rear of Nos. 34 & 36, High Street
- Nos. 35, 35a & 35b, High Street
- Nos. 36-38 (Woodcocks and W. G. Davies), High Street
- Nos. 40-42 High Street
- No. 39 (Xantippe), High Street
- No. 41 (Lloyds Chemist), High Street
- No. 43 High Street
- No. 48 (Duke of Wellington PH - including Rear Wing to Church Street), High Street
- No. 50 High Street II
- Nos. 51 & 53 (Vale of Glamorgan Public House), High Street
- No. 52 High Street
- No. 54 (Farthings Old Wine House), High Street
- No. 55 (Roddam Travel & Watts Morgan), High Street
- No. 56 High Street
- No. 58 High Street
- No. 60 (Former High Street Garage)
- No. 61 (HSBC (Midland Bank)), High Street
- No. 62 (Barclays Bank), High Street
- The Old Hall, High Street
- No. 63 (The Bear Hotel), High Street
- No. 66 (Ye Olde Mason's Arms PH), High Street
- No. 77 (Llwyn Celyn), High Street
- No. 81 High Street
- No. 83 (Woodstock House), High Street
- Northwest Boundary Wall to No. 83, High Street
- War Memorial in front of Town Hall, High Street
- The Old Brewery Building, High Street
- Building to rear of Town Hall, Town Hall Square
- Northwest Garden Wall to Rose Cottage and Southwest Garden Walls to Old Hall & Grammar School Garden Southeast, Town Mill Road
- Rose Cottage, including forecourt garden walls, Town Mill Road
- The Poplars, including garden walls and gate, Town Mill Road
- Telephone Call-Box outside Hill View & The Haven, Westgate
- Nos. 1 & 3, Westgate
- No. 4 (National Westminster Bank), Westgate
- No. 21, Westgate
- United Free Church (Ramoth Chapel), Westgate
- No. 34, Westgate
- Water Pump near Police Station, Westgate
- Police Station, Westgate

=== Cwm Cidy ===
- No 1. Cwm Cidy Farm
- No 2. Cwm Cidy Farm
- No. 3 Cwm Cidy Farm
- Cwm Cidy Farm Cottage

=== Dinas Powys ===
- Remains of Dinas Powys Castle, off Lettons Way, Dinas Powys
- Downs Farmhouse, Sully Road (Prev. recorded under 22.02.00)
- Dinas Powys Parish Hall, Britway Road, Dinas Powys
- Church of St. Peter, Mill Road, Dinas Powys
- The Mount, Mount Road, Dinas Powys
- Old Court, The Square (aka The Twyn), Dinas Powys
- War Memorial, The Square (aka The Twyn), Dinas Powys
- Lon Twyn, Twyncyn, Dinas Powys
- Biglis Farmhouse, off Argae Lane, Dinas Powys
- Barn at Biglis Farm, Dinas Powys
- Little Orchard (nos 1–6), Murch, Dinas Powys

=== East Aberthaw ===
- Aberthaw Lime and Cement Works
- East Kilns at Aberthaw Lime and Cement Works
- Aberthaw Signal Box
- The Granary
- Marsh House with attached garden wall

=== Ewenny ===
- Garden Gateway with gates and attached wall at Ewenny Priory (House)
- Garden wall linking North and South Gatehouses at Ewenny Priory (House)
- Northeast Precinct Wall at Ewenny Priory (House)
- Stable Court East range at Ewenny Priory (House)
- Stable Court North range at Ewenny Priory (House)
- Stable Court West range at Ewenny Priory (House)
- Barn on Ewenny Down
- Lampha Court and attached barn range
- Barn and attached ranges at Wallas Farm

=== Fonmon ===
- Stables of Fonmon Castle
- Walls of walled gardens at Fonmon Castle
- Retaining walls of South Gardens at Fonmon Castle
- East Hall (aka ‘Rosedene’)
- Walls surrounding Fonmon Pond inc. bridge and weir and wells
- Fonmon Well

=== Leckwith ===
- Brynwell Farmhouse – Including attached agricultural buildings

=== Llanblethian ===
- Roadside Cross, Church Road
- Breach Farm House, Llantwit Major Road
- Kingscombe, Llanmihangel Road
- Llanblethian House and No. 2, including Forecourt, Walls & Railings Church Road
- Telephone Call-Box, Bridge Street, near Brook Cottage

=== Llancadle ===
- Cliff Farmhouse

=== Llancarfan ===
- Telephone Call-Box between Parish Hall and the bridge

=== Michaelston-le-Pit ===
- Telephone Call-Box by Church Cottages
- 1,2,& 3 Church Cottages
- Lychgate at Church of St. Michael
- Cwrt yr Ala House
- The Old Dairy at Cwrt yr Ala House

==== Outlying ====
- Barn at Garn-Llwyd
- Llanfythin Farmhouse
- Gatehouse at Llanfythin Farmhouse
- Llanfythin Mill
- Circular Pigsty at ‘The Meadows’ ( Formerly Tre-Aubrey House)
- Llanfythin Mill House

=== Llandough, Llanfair ===
- Church of St. Dochdwy
- Llandough Castle Flats
- Northeast, Southeast, and Southwest walls, gatepiers and railings enclosing Llandough Castle and Gatehouse
- Village Hall
- The Rectory

=== Llandough, Penarth ===
- St. Dochdwy's Church
- Former National School and School House at No. 2 Lewis Road
- Pound Cottage
- Barons Court Public House and Restaurant

=== Llandow ===
- Great House
- Barn to East of Great House
- Ty Fry Farmhouse
- The Rectory

=== Llanfrynach ===
- Cross base in churchyard of Church of St Brynach

=== Llangan ===
- Church of St. Canna, Llangan
- Church of St. Mary, St. Mary Hill
- Telephone Call-Box opposite Mount Pleasant Farm, Llangan
- Churchyard Cross at Church of St. Mary, St. Mary Hill
- Churchyard Wall at Church of St. Mary, St. Mary Hill
- Cross Base at Village Farmhouse St. Mary Hill
- Saron Welsh Congregational Chapel, Treoes
- Chimney 100m North of Gelliaraul Farmhouse
- Mount Pleasant Farmhouse with attached barn
- The Old Rectory
- Pantruthin-fach Farmhouse
- Cowshed at Pantruthin-fach Farm
- The Star Inn, P.H.Treoes
- Treoes Farmhouse

=== Llanmaes ===
- Cross in Churchyard of Church of St. Cattwg (Llanmaes Church)
- Railed Tomb to Nicholl Family E of Chancel at Church of St. Cattwg
- Dovecot at Llanmaes House (Great House)
- Plaisted House
- Plaised Cottage
- Telephone Call-Box North of village centre (set away from road)
- Barn at Great House Farm
- ‘Picketston’, Picketston

=== Llanmihangel ===
- Terrace and steps at Yew Tree Pleasance, Plas Llanmihangel
- St. Anne's Well
- Rectory Farm

=== Llansannor ===
- Barn at Court Farm
- Cross in Churchyard of Church of St. Senwyr
- Westwing of Llansannor Court
- The Cottage Llansannor Court
- Former Cartshed and Granary at Court Farm
- Is-y-coed Farmhouse
- Llansannor House
- The Old Rectory

=== Llantrithyd ===
- Ruins of Llantrithyd Place
- Telephone Call-Box, North of Parish Church
- Ty Draw Farmhouse
- Agricultural outbuildings Ty Draw Farm

=== Llantwit Major and Boverton ===
- Churchyard Cross, Church Street
- Churchyard walls and gates to St. Illtud's Church, Burial Lane
- Mid Well, Bakers Lane
- Circular Walls and Steps at West End Pond
- Batslays Farmhouse
- Boverton Park House (Prev. Boverton Place Farmhouse)
- Boverton Place
- ‘The Causeway’ (Prev. No. 4. The Causeway and “Navron”)
- ‘Navron’ (Prev. No. 4. The Causeway and “Navron”)
- Walls surrounding garden to West of Boverton House (Prev. doorway and walls of garden to West of Boverton House)
- Boverton House and attached stable block
- Garden Walls and railings of Boverton House
- Wall and Gateway Opposite Boverton House
- Cherry Tree Cottage (Prev. Nos. 1 and 2, Boverton Court Farm or Boverton Court Cottage)
- Tudor Cottage (Prev. Nos. 1 and 2, Boverton Court Farm or Boverton Court Cottage)
- Orchard House
- Former Chantry Priest's House, Burial Lane
- Chantry House, Hillhead
- Old Place or Llantwit Major Castle
- Forecourt Wall of Old Place
- Old Plas Cottage, West Street
- Well opposite Downcross Farm, West Street
- Downcross Farmhouse, Including Front Garden Wall (Prev. Downcross Farm, West Street)
- Footbridge over stream, West entrance to St. Illtud's Churchyard, Church of St. Illtud
- Tudor Tavern Public House
- 1 Church Street (Prev. Nos. 1 and 1A, Church Street)
- Quaintways with attached garden wall (Prev. Ty Ny and Southern wing of Quaintways, Colhugh Street)
- Ty Ny with attached garden wall (Prev. Ty Ny and Southern wing of Quaintways, Colhugh Street)
- To-Hesg (Prev. Ty Hesg) Colhugh Street
- Old Rosedew House (Prev. Rosedew, Colhugh Street)
- Rosedew, Colhugh Street
- Bethel Baptist Church, Commercial Street
- The Old House, Court Close (Prev. House to Northeast of Pear Tree Cottage, High Street)
- Plymouth House, Plymouth Street (Prev. Plymouth House (including mounting block))
- Garden Wall, Gate and Mounting Block and Stables at Plymouth House
- Lodge to Dimlands (Prev. Dimlands House) Dimlands Road
- Tyle House
- Bethesda’r Fro Chapel with attached mounting block Eglwys Brewis Road
- Forecourt and Graveyard Gates, Gatepiers and Walls of Bethesda’r Fro Chapel Eglwys Brewis Road
- Malta House, 1 Flanders Road
- 2 Flanders Road
- The Cottage with attached Garden Walls, 4 Flanders Road (Prev. Nos. 3 and 4, Flanders Road)
- Flanders Farmhouse, Flanders Road
- Garden Wall and Gate of Flanders Road
- Lower House (Prev. Lower House Farm) Flanders Road
- Great Frampton
- Barn and Stable Range at Great Frampton Farmhouse
- Court House, High Street
- Sunny Bank, with attached Garden Walls, High Street
- Outhouse at Sunnybank
- The Old Police Station, Hillhead
- Little Frampton Farmhouse
- Brooklands Cottage, Methodist Lane
- Summerhouse Fort, Summerhouse Camp
- Summerhouse Tower, Summerhouse Camp
- Fonmon Cottage (Prev. Fonmon House) Station Road
- War Memorial, (Formerly base of war memorial)The Square
- Telephone Call-Box, Outside Old White Hart Public House
- Pear Tree Cottage with attached wall and mounting block (Prev. Corner House and Pear Tree Cottage [including mounting block], Turkey Street)
- Corner House (Prev. Corner House and Pear Tree Cottage [including mounting block], Turkey Street)
- Rewley Court (Prev. Rawley Court) Turkey Street
- West Farm, West St. (Prev. West Farmhouse and garden walls)
- Front Garden Wall to West Farm
- Walls to [detached] garden to West Farm on SE side of West Street
- Hill Cottage, West Street
- Swimbridge Farmhouse, with attached garden walls, Westhill Street
- The Swine Bridge, Westhill Street
- Downs Farmhouse, Wick Road
- Circular Pigsty, Downs Farm, Wick Road
- Windmill House (Prev. Frampton Windmill) Windmill Lane
- Old White Hart Inn Public House, Wine Street
- The Old School, including attached walling, Wine Street (Prev. The Old Rectory- (Formerly Presbytery and Llanilltud Fawr County Junior School))

=== Llysworney ===
- Church of St.Tydfil
- Llysworney House (Great House)
- The Old Sheep Washery
- Former Church School
- Former Ebenezer Particular Baptist Church
- Milepost at the Carne Arms Public House

=== Nash ===
- Pheasant House, Nash Manor
- Pigeon House, Nash Manor

=== Old Beaupre ===
- Former Hall Range to South of Old Beaupre Castle
- Old Beaupre Barn

=== Peterston-super-Ely ===
- Llanwensan Fawr Farmhouse
- Telephone Call-Box, outside Fircot
- Croes-y-Parc Baptist Chapel [see also 16.20]
- Road Bridge over Nant Criafol
- 1 Pwll y Min Crescent
- 2 Pwll y Min Crescent
- 3 Pwll y Min Crescent
- 4 Pwll y Min Crescent
- 5 Pwll y Min Crescent
- 6 Pwll y Min Crescent
- 7 Pwll y Min Crescent
- 8 Pwll y Min Crescent
- 9 Pwll y Min Crescent
- 10 Pwll y Min Crescent
- 4 & 6 Cory Crescent
- 8 & 10 Cory Crescent
- 16 & 18 Cory Crescent
- Rectory House (aka ‘The Old Rectory’)
- Monument to Dafydd Williams Croes y parc Baptist Chapel

=== Penarth and Cogan ===
See also Listed buildings in Penarth

- No. 41, Albert Road, (Former Post Office now restaurant)
- Pillar Box outside Post Office, Albert Road
- Albert Road County Infants’ School
- School House at No. 17 Albert Road
- Telephone Call-Box, on the edge of Albert Road Gardens
- Cenotaph, Alexandra Park
- No. 20 Archer Road
- No. 22 Archer Road
- No. 24, Archer Road, (see also 25, Victoria Road)
- North Lodge, (Piermaster's lodge) Windsor Gardens, Bridgeman Road
- Remains of Cwrt-y-Vil Grange (Castle), 2 Castle Avenue
- Telephone Call-Box at the corner of Church Avenue and Clive Place
- Footbridge (Cogan Station), Cogan Hill
- Customs House, Dock Road
- Marine Buildings, Dock Road
- Inn at the Deep End, Esplanade
- Telephone Call-Box, in front of Pavilion and Pier
- Penarth Pier, including Pavilion and Shops
- Coastguard Cottage, No. 2, Marine Parade (see also Nos. 1-5 Tower Hill Avenue)
- No. 13 Marine Parade (Greylands)
- No. 14 Marine Parade (Leigh Holme)
- Headlands School, Paget Place
- No. 2, Plymouth Road
- No. 4, Plymouth Road
- Nos. 6, Plymouth Road
- Nos. 8, Plymouth Road
- Nos. 10, Plymouth Road
- Turner House Gallery, Plymouth Road
- Telephone Call-Box close to junction with Stanwell Road
- Public Library, Stanwell Road
- Trinity Methodist Church, Stanwell Road
- Church Hall, adj. Trinity Methodist, Stanwell Road
- Telephone Call-Box outside Nos. 5 and 5a, Royal Buildings, Station Approach
- No. 1 (of 5), Tower Hill Avenue
- No. 2 (of 5), Tower Hill Avenue
- No. 3 (of 5), Tower Hill Avenue
- No. 4 (of 5), Tower Hill Avenue
- No. 5 (of 5), Tower Hill Avenue (see also No. 2 Coastguard Cottage, Marine Parade)
- Paget Rooms, Victoria Road
- No. 20, Victoria Road
- No. 22, Victoria Road (St Margarets)
- No. 25, Victoria Road (see also No. 24 Archer Road)
- No. 60, The Red House, Victoria Road
- All Saint's Parish Hall, Victoria Square
- Windsor Arcade Building
- Lloyd's Bank, Windsor Road
- Woodland Hall, Woodland Place
- St. Joseph's Church, Wordsworth Avenue
- St. Joseph's Presbytery, Wordsworth Avenue
- ‘Sea Roads’ Cliff Parade

=== Pendoylan ===
- Pendoylan Cottages
- Telephone Call-Box at Heol St. Cattwg (North Side)
- Cae’r Wigau Isaf
- Cae’r Wigau Uchaf
- Duffryn Mawr Farmhouse
- Hensol Bridge
- Hafod Lodge to Hensol Castle, (also known as Bottom Lodge)
- Llwyn Rhyddid
- Ty Fry Lodge

=== Penllyn ===
- Great House [Formerly Great House Farmhouse]
- Penllyn Castle
- The Lodge Cottage, Penllyn Castle
- The Cottage, ‘Penllyn Cottage’, Penllyn Castle
- Gatepiers, gates and boundary walls at entrance to Penllyn Castle
- Village Farmhouse
- Easternmost Salmon Well
- Central Salmon Well
- Westernmost Salmon Well
- Church of St John the Evangelist
- The Old School House

=== Penmark ===
- Cross in churchyard of Church of St. Mary
- Casberd family tomb in churchyard of Church of St. Mary
- Memorial to John and Mary Jenkins in churchyard of Church of St. Mary
- Sarah Elizabeth Jones Memorial Cross in churchyard of Church of St. Mary
- Kenson Bridge
- Telephone Call-Box at centre of village / corner of Croft John

=== Peterston-super-Ely ===
- Llanwensan Fawr Farmhouse
- Telephone Call-Box, outside Fircot
- Croes-y-Parc Baptist Chapel [see also 16.20]
- Road Bridge over Nant Criafol
- 1 Pwll y Min Crescent
- 2 Pwll y Min Crescent
- 3 Pwll y Min Crescent
- 4 Pwll y Min Crescent
- 5 Pwll y Min Crescent
- 6 Pwll y Min Crescent
- 7 Pwll y Min Crescent
- 8 Pwll y Min Crescent
- 9 Pwll y Min Crescent
- 10 Pwll y Min Crescent
- 4 & 6 Cory Crescent
- 8 & 10 Cory Crescent
- 16 & 18 Cory Crescent
- Rectory House (aka ‘The Old Rectory’)
- Monument to Dafydd Williams Croes y parc Baptist Chapel

=== Rhoose ===
- Lower Farmhouse Fontygary Road
- Lower Farm Cottage and attached garden wall, Brendon View Close
- Rhoose Council School, Fontygary Road

==== Cwm Ciddy ====
- No 1. Cwm Cidy Farm
- No 2. Cwm Cidy Farm
- No. 3 Cwm Cidy Farm
- Cwm Cidy Farm Cottage

==== East Aberthaw ====
- Aberthaw Lime and Cement Works
- East Kilns at Aberthaw Lime and Cement Works
- Aberthaw Signal Box
- The Granary
- Marsh House with attached garden wall

==== Fonmon ====
- Stables of Fonmon Castle
- Walls of walled gardens at Fonmon Castle
- Retaining walls of South Gardens at Fonmon Castle
- East Hall (aka ‘Rosedene’)
- Walls surrounding Fonmon Pond inc. bridge and weir and wells
- Fonmon Well

==== Lower Porthkerry ====
- Lower Porthkerry Farmhouse, Porthkerry Road
- Upper Porthkerry Farmhouse

==== Porthkerry ====
- Cross in Church of St. Curig
- The Old Schoolhouse - Cottage at West end of Churchyard
- Porthkerry Viaduct (partly in Barry community)

=== Sigingstone ===
- Green Farm II

=== St Andrews Major ===
- Churchyard Cross, St Andrews’ Churchyard, St. Andrews Major
- The Bier House, St Andrews’ Churchyard, St. Andrews Major
- Garn Hill and attached Garden Terrace, St. Andrews Major
- 1 Little Orchard, Murch
- 2 Little Orchard, Murch
- 3 Little Orchard, Murch
- 4 Little Orchard, Murch
- 5 Little Orchard, Murch
- 6 Little Orchard, Murch

=== St Athan ===
==== St. Athan ====
- Anonymous Monument and railings in Churchyard of Church of St Athan
- St Athan War Memorial
- The Old Rectory (Balfour House)
- Myrtle Cottage and out buildings
- West Farmhouse
- West Orchard Farmhouse
- Aderyn [Prev. part of West Orchard Farmhouse]

==== Castleton ====
- Bakehouse and Donkey Stable at Castleton Farmhouse
- Former Barn at Castleton Farm

==== East Orchard ====
- Retainers Hall at East Orchard [part remains of East Orchard Castle]
- Dovecote at East Orchard [part of remains of East Orchard Castle]

==== Eglwys Brewis ====
- Church of St. Brise

==== Flemingston ====
- Detached Kitchen at Flemingston Court
- Garden Wall and House Ruins at Flemingston Manor
- Combination farm buildings at Flemingston Court Farm
- Telephone Call-Box North of parish church
- Gregory Farm / Yr Hen Fferm Dy

==== Gileston ====
- Cross in Churchyard of Church of St Giles
- Stable Block at Gileston Manor
- Cheesehouse at Gileston Manor
- Walls and attached Summerhouse of Walled Gardens at Gileston Manor
- Pigsty at Gileston Manor
- Garden Walls along Roadside at Gileston Manor
- Kitchen Garden Wall at Gileston Manor
- Rose Cottage
- Telephone Call-Box at road junction in centre of the village

==== West Aberthaw ====
- West Aberthaw Farmhouse
- Garden Wall of West Aberthaw Farmhouse
- Barn at West Aberthaw Farm
- Cart Shed at West Aberthaw Farm
- Bull House (Old Chapel) at West Aberthaw Farm
- Heavy Horse Stable at West Aberthaw Farm

=== Ogmore by Sea ===
- Ogmore Farm
- Stables at Ogmore Farm
- Old Star Cottage
- Barn at Ty Maen
- Sutton

==== St. Brides Major ====
- Bryn Sion Presbyterian Chapel
- Pen-ucha’r Dre Farmhouse
- Castle upon Alun House and garden walls to South and East
- Former Byre at Castle upon Alun
- Cartshed, Castle upon Alun
- Churchyard Cross Church of St. Bridget
- The Old Vicarage
- Blackhall Farm
- Bee Boles at Blackhall Farm
- Clapper Bridge
- Pont Groes Gwta
- Barn and Cow Houses at Pen Ucha Dre

==== Dunraven Park ====
- Grand Lodge
- Former Ice Tower and Banqueting Hall
- Boundary and Dividing Walls to Walled Garden
- Garden Building
- Entrance gateway with Flanking Wall at Dunraven House
- Boundary Wall and Entrance gate to S of Seamouth Lodge
- Seamouth Lodge
- Boundary Wall North of Seamouth Lodge
- Slade

==== Durval ====
- Seamouth Cottage
- Dovecot at Durval Farm
- Fynnon y Winch [pump house]

==== Heol y Mynydd ====
- Fynnon y Pant
- Evergreen Cottage

==== Southerndown ====
- Sunshine House
- Clifton House and the Link

=== St. George’s Super-Ely ===
==== St. Bride’s ====
- St.-y-Nyll Windmill Tower and Barn remains
- Church of St. Ffraid St. Bride's
- St-y-Nyll

==== St. George’s ====
- Churchyard Cross at Church of St. George
- Church Cottage
- Ty Ffynnon

==== Coedarhydyglyn ====
- Gate and Gatepiers, midway along South drive, Coedarhydyglyn
- Gate and Gatepiers beside South Lodge, Coedarhydyglyn

=== St. Hilary ===
- Churchyard cross, Church of St. Hilary
- Bassett Family Tomb Enclosure, Church of St. Hilary
- The Bush Inn
- Pigsty in garden of Church Cottage
- No 1 Manor Cottages (Prev. Nos. 1 and 2, Manor Cottages)
- No. 2 Manor Cottages
- The Manor
- Village Farm
- Telephone Call-Box opposite Village Farm
- The Cottage
- New Beaupre

=== St. Mary’s Church ===
- Church of St. Mary
- Church Cottage, (aka Old Rectory)
- Fishweir Farmhouse
- Barn at Fishweir

=== St. Nicholas ===
- Fountain to South of Dyffryn House
- Pompeian Garden, Dyffryn House
- Walled Garden, Dyffryn House
- Lower South Terrace at Dyffryn Gardens
- Vine Walk and Kiosks, Dyffryn Gardens
- Cory Family chest-tomb at Church of St. Nicholas
- No. 3 Smiths Row (Blacksmith Cottages)
- No. 4 Smiths Row (Blacksmith Cottages)
- No. 5 Smiths Row (Blacksmith Cottages)
- The Three Tuns
- Telephone Call-Box, A48 (North side) on approach to Church
- GPO pillar box, A48 (North side) on approach to Church
- St. Nicholas Church Hall
- St. Nicholas Church Hall House
- Cottrell Lodge

=== St Donats ===
==== St Donats ====
- Churchyard Wall of Church of St Donat's inc. railings and Gate
- Nicholl-Carne Memorial Cross in Churchyard of Church of St Donat's
- Cottage against Southeast Churchyard wall - Church of St Donat's
- The Old Rectory
- Wall of entrance forecourt at St Donat's Castle and part of Northwest Boundary Wall
- Walls of entrance forecourt flanking the bridge at St. Donat's Castle
- Staff house in NE corner of the entrance forecourt
- Music Dept at Atlantic College (Prev. Former Coach House at Castle)
- Former forecourt stables at St Donat's Castle
- St. Donat's Arts Centre (Prev. Tithe Barn at St. Donat's Castle)
- Art Department of Atlantic College
- Walls, Steps, Terraces, Pavilion, Summerhouse and cottage attached to the wall of the hanging gardens
- Sundial at St Donat's Castle
- The Cavalry Barracks
- Sea walls and towers at St Donat's Castle
- Watchtower to West of St Donat's Castle
- Top (East) Lodge to St Donat's Castle inc. attached garden wall
- North Lodge to St Donat's Castle
- East Boundary Wall of St Donat's Castle
- Cartref
- Splott Farmhouse and adjoining Granary Wing

==== Marcross ====
- Churchyard wall, gatepiers and gates, to church of holy trinity running along the road
- Sundial in churchyard of Church of the Holy Trinity
- High wall comprising remains of Marcross Castle, bounding part of Southwest farmyard of Village Farm
- Freestanding outbuilding at Village Farm incorporating remains of Marcross Castle and sited on Southwest

==== Monknash ====
- Church Farmhouse
- Garden wall of Church Farmhouse
- Outhouse range to South of Church Farmhouse
- Dovecot at Monknash Grange (Prev. Remains of medieval dovecote)
- Monknash Forge
- Plough and Harrow Public House inc. front garden walls

=== Nash Point ===
- Lower (West) Lighthouse and attached Keepers Houses, walls and ancillary buildings
- Fog Station at Nash Point Lighthouse
- Upper (East) Lighthouse and attached keepers houses, walls and ancillary buildings

=== Sully ===
- Church of St John the Baptist ‘Sully Church’
- Former Lodge & Screen Walls flanking driveway entrance to Sully Hospital
- Cog House [formerly Cog Farm including buildings and eight Rickstands]
- Planned Group of farm buildings at Cog Farm
- Eight Rickstands at N Side of Cog Farm
- Hayes Farm Windmill
- Church of St. Lawrence
- Limekiln, Ashby Road
- Barn at Home Farm
- Swanbridge House, St Mary's Well Bay Road

=== Sutton ===
- Sutton Farmhouse II*
- Long Range of Outbuildings to Northwest of Sutton Farmhouse
- Small Outbuilding immediately to West of Sutton Farmhouse

=== Walterston ===
- Walterston Fach Farmhouse
- Barn at Trewallter Fawr

=== Wenvoe ===
- Telephone Call-Box on village green, Wenvoe
- Nant Bran Farmhouse
- Agricultural Range opposite Nant Bran Farmhouse
- Outbuildings to North of Nant Bran Farmhouse
- Former Bull Shed at Nant Bran Farm
- The Old Rectory
- Former Coach House and Stables at Wenvoe Castle
- Former Walled Kitchen garden wall at Wenvoe Castle – West Range
- Barn at Goldsland Farm
- Well House, Dyffryn Gardens
- Lidmore Farmhouse
- Lower South Terrace at Dyffryn Gardens
- Lions Steps, Dyffryn Gardens
- Fountain to South of Dyffryn House
- Vine Walk and Kiosks, Dyffryn Gardens

=== Welsh St Donats ===
- Churchyard Wall of Church of St. Donat
- Great House
- Pigsty at Ty-draw

=== Wick ===
- Remains of Preaching Cross St James’ Church, Church Street
- Ruined Windmill Tower [off Church Street]
- Primrose Cottage, Church Street
- Bluebell Cottage, Church Street
- Lamb Cottage, Church Street
- Sycamore House, Church Street
- Brooks Farm and adjoining range, West Street
- Farm Range to NE of Brooks Farm
- Cow House and stable range to NE Brooks Farm

==== Green Isaf ====
- Green Isha Farm with adjoining Stable and Dovecot
- Yr Hen Felin Wynt, Green Isaf

==== Trepit ====
- Trepit Cottage, Trepit.

==== Picket ====
- Mill, Threshing Barn and Cart Shed at Church Farm
- Outbuilding at Church Farm [1]
- Outbuilding at Church Farm [2]
- Outbuilding at Church Farm [3]
- Outbuilding at Church farm [4]

=== Ystradowen ===
- Church of St Owain
- Churchyard Wall and Gates of Church of St Owain
- Llwynhelig House

== See also ==
- Listed buildings in Wales
