= St Donat's Church, St Donats =

Coordinates: 51.4016°N 3.5343°W

St Donat's Church
- Eglwys Sain Dunwyd
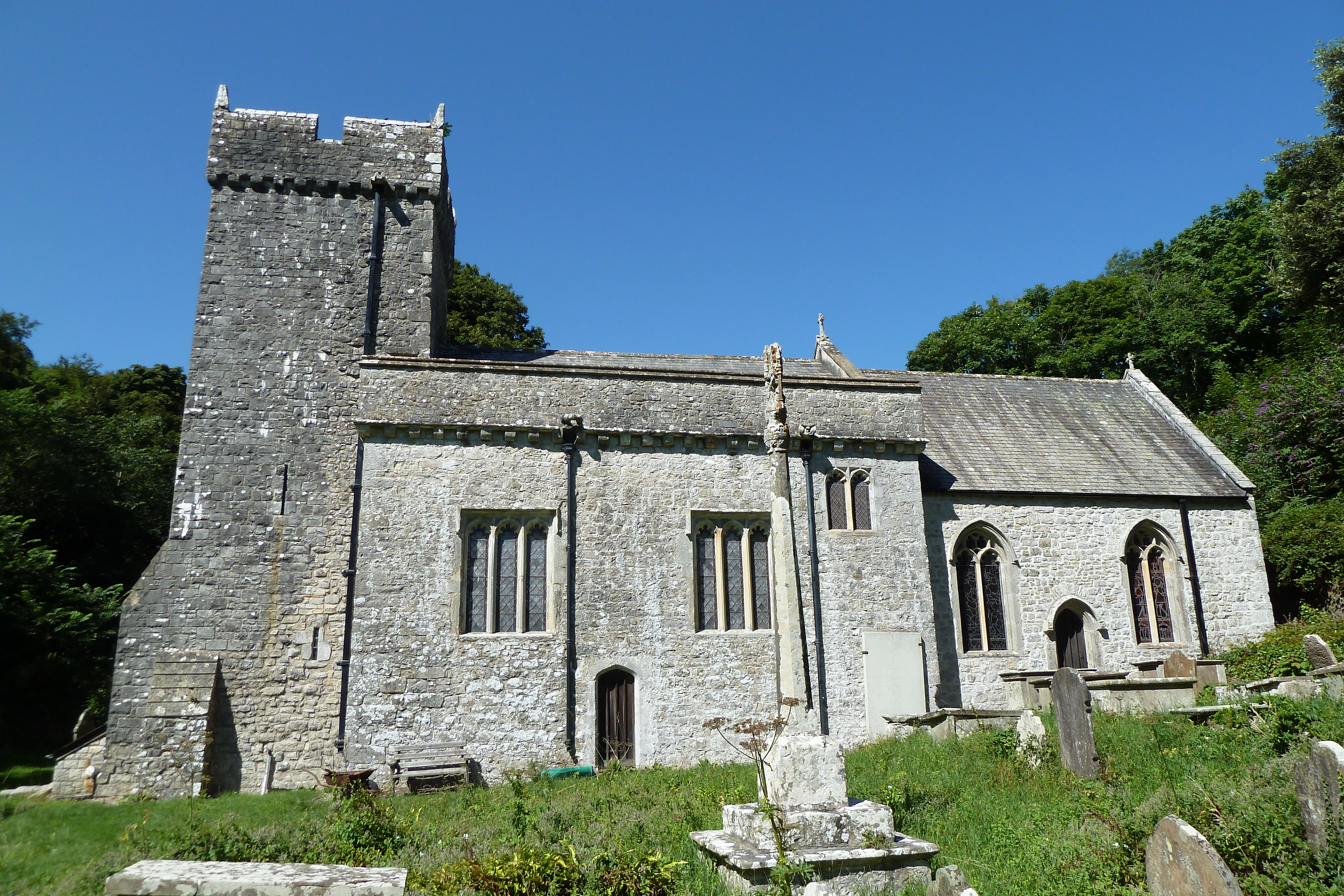
- The Church of St Donat's

- Location in Vale of Glamorgan
- Location: Llanblethian, Vale of Glamorgan
- Country: Wales
- Denomination: Church in Wales

History
- Founded: 12th century
- Dedication: St Dunwyd

Architecture
- Heritage designation: Grade I
- Architectural type: Church
- Style: Medieval

St Donat's Church (Welsh: Eglwys Sain Dunwyd) is a Grade I listed church in St Donats, in the Vale of Glamorgan, south Wales. It became a Grade I listed building on 22 February 1963.

== History ==
St Donat's Church was originally a small 12th-century church with an apsed chancel. By the early 14th century the tower was added which was followed towards the late 14th century by the Lady Chapel, now known as the Stradling Chapel. The chancel was rebuilt in the 15th century and the nave in the following century. In 1878 Dr. Nicholl-Carne paid for the restoration of the main body of the church. In 1907 the then patron of the church, Morgan Stuart Williams, ordered the reconstruction of the tower. A heating chamber was later added to the tower but this was reconstructed in the late 20th century.

The church has a long-standing association with the Stradling baronets, whose home, St Donat's Castle, overlooks the church. Several monuments to the Stradlings from the 17th and 18th centuries are found within its walls. They also had strong associations with the Hancorne family. Thomas Hancorne, a Jacobite prominent in High Church circles, was rector of St Donat's from 1674 to 1707.

The church was granted Grade I listed building status in 1963, on the grounds that it was "highly graded as an important early medieval church with the particularly fine Stradling Chapel and for its historic associations with St. Donat's Castle".

== Architecture ==
Originally built in the 12th century, St Donat's retains architectural features from all five of its different stages of growth. The chancel arch is evidence of its 12th-century construction, plain, round-headed with primitive caps. The double-headed, double-chamfered tower arch is believed to be early 14th century, while the north chancel chapel, with its square-headed three light eastern window, was added later that century. The chancel was reconstructed in the 15th century with many features from that period still in evidence: the piscina (altar basin) with cusped ogee hood, the nave with its north porch, the corbelled parapets to the nave with gargoyles and the corbelled tower battlements. The work from this period also shows comparisons to the late-15th-century hall at the castle.

The body of the church was restored in 1878 and the tower in 1907. Other features of note include the circular font with roll top and bottom with scale patterned sides, and a medieval wooden lectern, not original to the church, which was bought in 1913. The eastern window is of stained glass and displays an image of Saint Donat (circa 1862), believed to be by Clayton and Bell, but its provenance is uncertain.

== Monuments and art ==
The churchyard contains several structures of note, several of them having listed building status. One of the oldest features is a complete 15th-century preaching cross mounted on a three-stepped plinth. The cross is listed as a grade I listed building recognised '...for its special interest as a complete medieval cross with a rare medieval gravestone beside it.' It is also a Scheduled monument. A memorial cross to Mary Anne Nicholl-Carne, a former owner of St Donat's Castle who died in 1879, has grade II listed status and is found to the north-west of the church tower. The walls and railings surrounding the churchyard are also grade II listed; they date from the 19th century but include some sections of earlier 17th-century design.

Within the church, held in the Stradling Chapel, are three painted family portraits on panels, depicting Sir Edward Stradling (1529-1609) and his wife, the others his forebears, dated 1590 and signed by Byrd. These items were stolen from the chapel in 1991, but subsequently recovered; those presently on display are now photographic copies. The chapel also contains the tombs of Sir Edward Stradling (1699-1726) and Sir Thomas Stradling (1710-1738), last of the Stradling line.

== Gallery ==
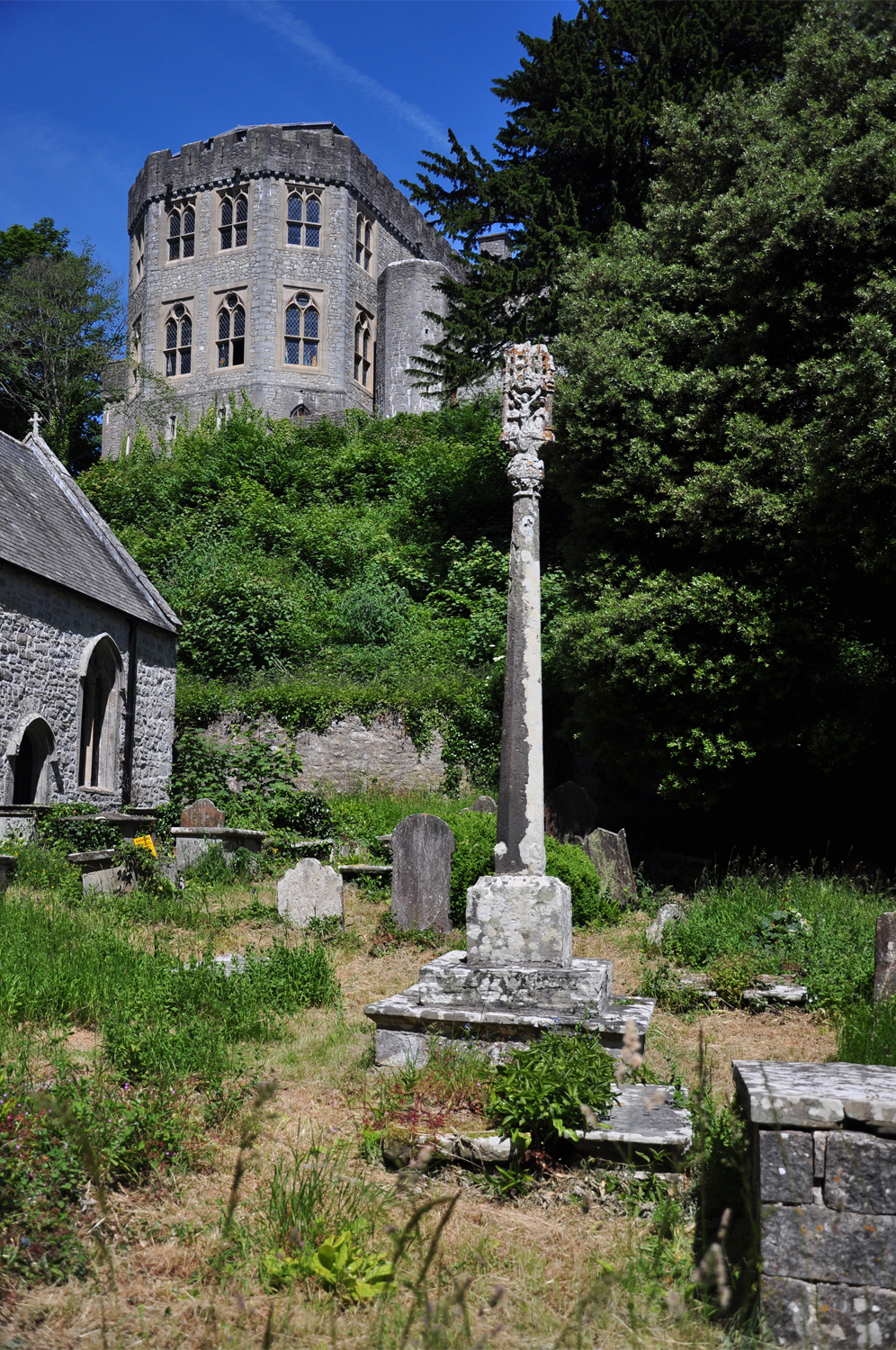
The churchyard cross, a Grade I listed structure and a scheduled monument

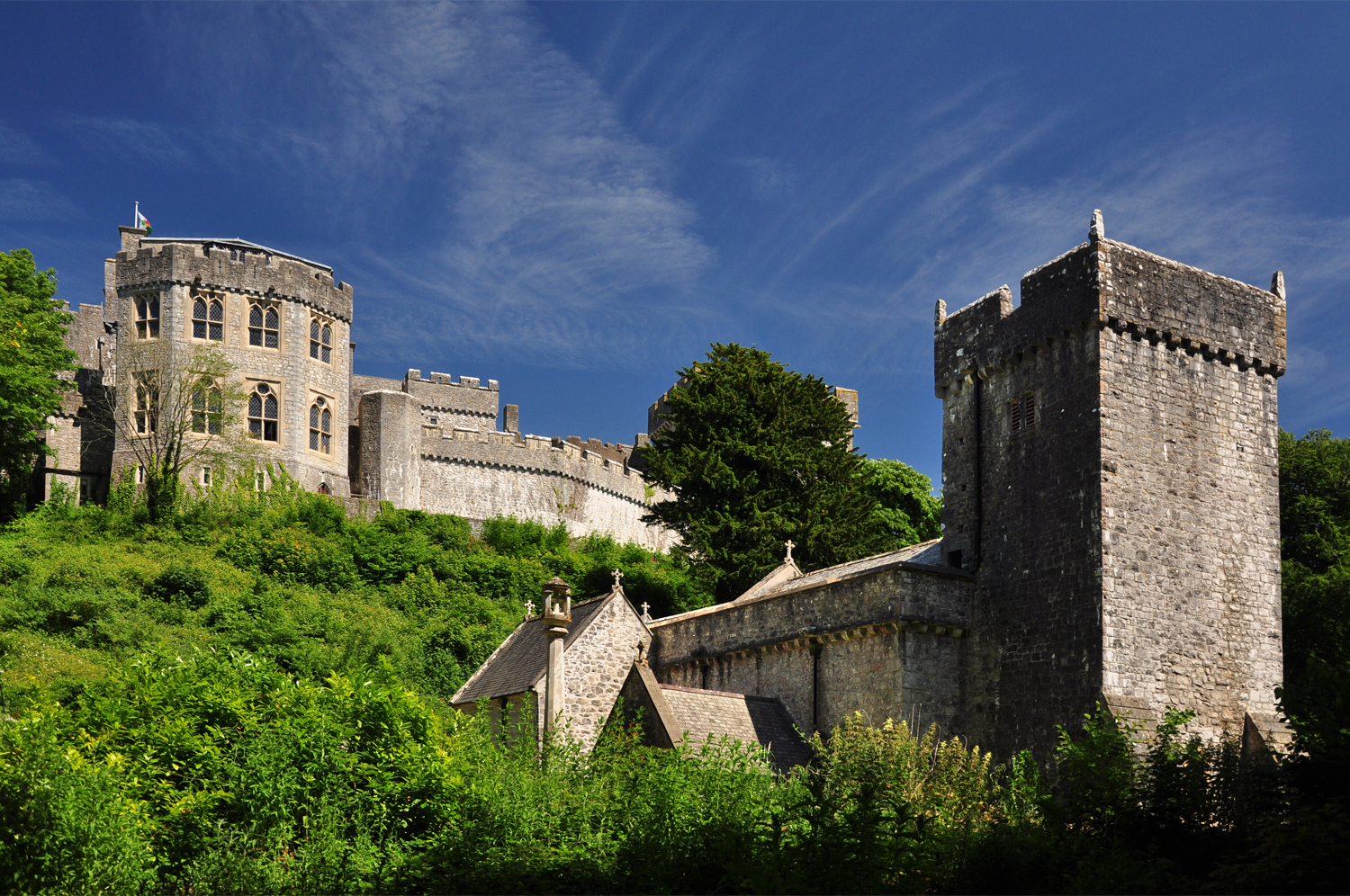
The church below the castle

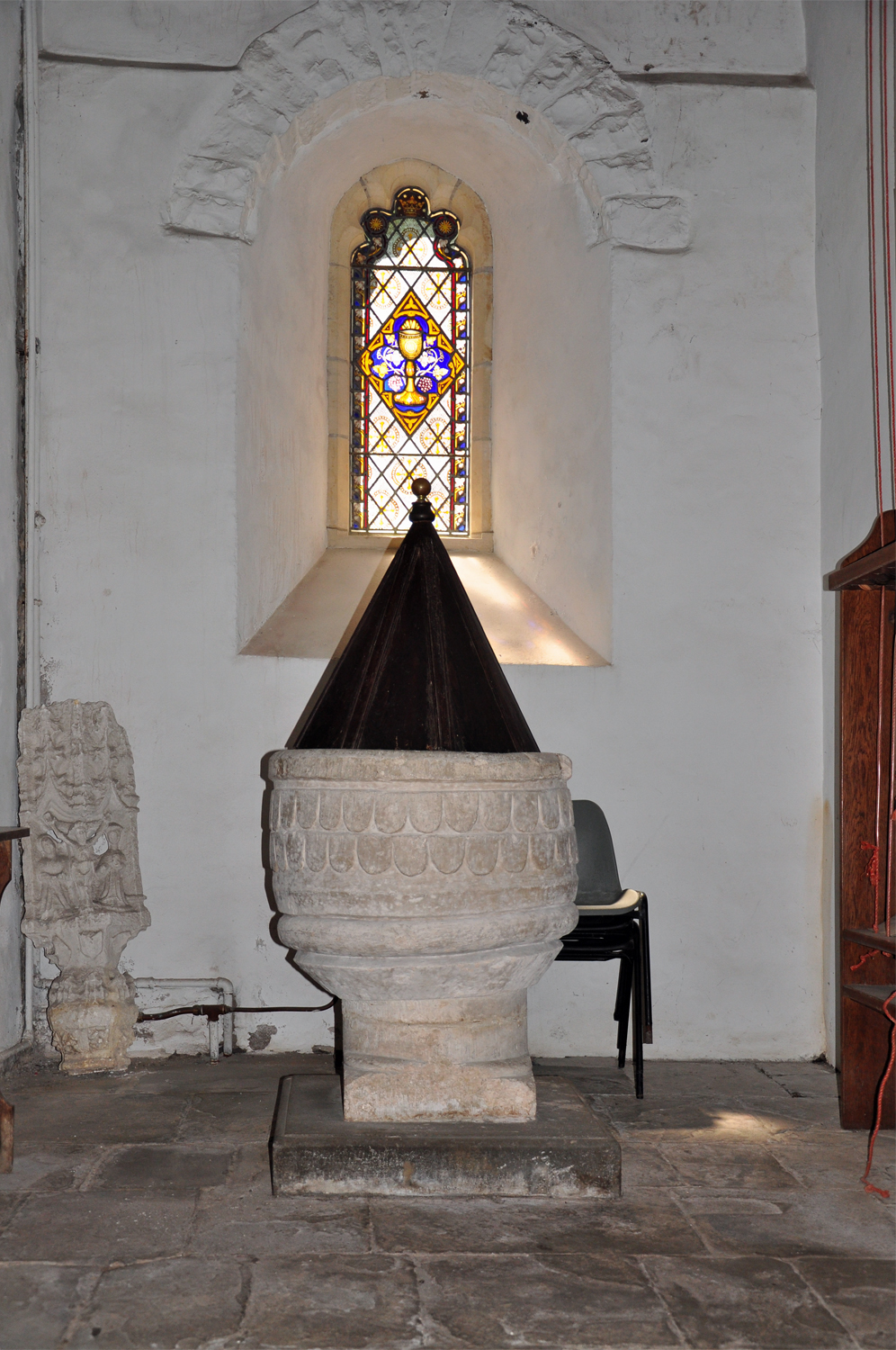
The font
