= Cadoxton Court Dovecote =

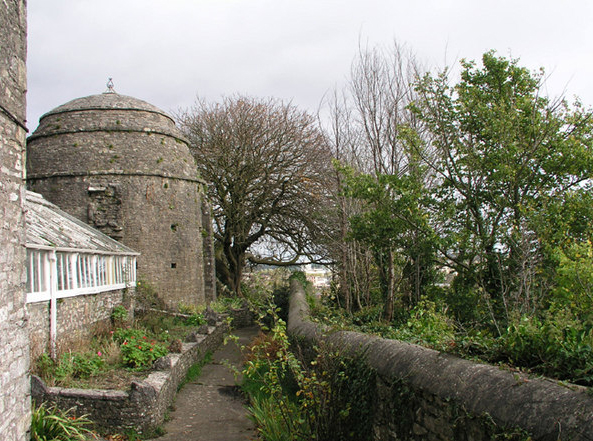
- The largest of the remaining medieval dovecotes in Glamorgan.

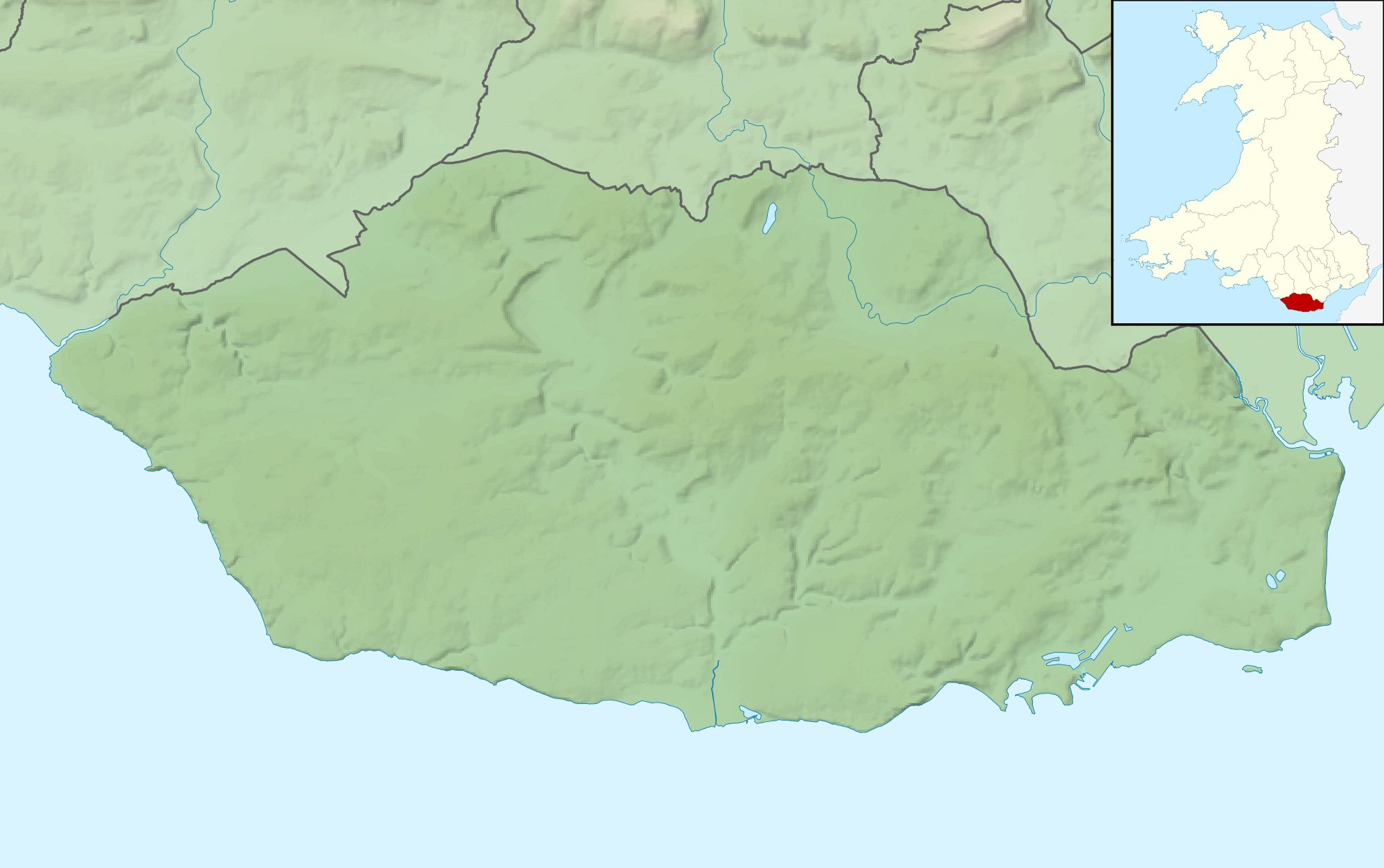
- Location within Vale of Glamorgan
- 51.4116°N 3.2556°W
- Type: Dovecote
- Location: Cadoxton, Vale of Glamorgan, Wales

History
- Built: 13th century

Site notes
- Architectural style: Vernacular
- Governing body: Privately owned

Listed Building – Grade I
- Official name: Dovecote at Cadoxton Court
- Designated: 18 September 1962
- Reference no.: 13176

Listed Building – Grade II
- Official name: Cadoxton Court
- Designated: 30 March 1995
- Reference no.: 15902

Cadoxton Court Dovecote is a medieval structure in Cadoxton, in the Vale of Glamorgan, south Wales. Dating from the 13th century, it is the largest of the remaining medieval dovecotes in the Vale and a Grade I listed building.

== History and description ==
The dovecote was originally built in the 13th century as an ancillary building to the medieval house that stood on the site of the present Cadoxton Court. Cadw's listing record describes it as the largest remaining medieval dovecote in the Vale of Glamorgan. The Royal Commission on the Ancient and Historical Monuments of Wales considers it a post-medieval structure, ascribing a construction date in the 15th century. The dovecote supported a medieval farmstead, based on the site of a manor house which was demolished in the 18th century, and replaced in the 19th by the present Cadoxton Court. The dovecote has been subject to later restoration.

The dovecote is circular in design, built in stone, and stands 8M high. The walls are over a metre thick. The structure originally housed 700 nesting boxes, giving capacity for 1,400 pigeons. The dovecote is a Grade I listed structure. Cadoxton Court has its own Grade II listing.

== Sources ==
- Newman, John (1995). The Buildings of Wales: Glamorgan. London, UK: Penguin. ISBN 0140710566.
