= Nash Manor =

Grade I listed building in Llandow, south Wales

Coordinates: 51.44588°N 3.49449°W

Nash Manor is a Grade I listed building in Llandow, near Cowbridge in the Vale of Glamorgan, south Wales. It became a Grade I listed building on 16 December 1952.

== The Manor ==
The manor is located in its own private grounds to the north of the Llandow trading estate and about half a mile south of Llysworney. There are a pair of gates at the entrance to the drive which is at the junction of the B4268 and the B4270. There is a forecourt in front of the property.

The house has long been the property of the Carne family. Sir Edward Carne lived here at the time the house was built at the beginning of the sixteenth century. Over the ensuing five centuries it has seen a number of adaptations and refurbishments but has retained its sixteenth and seventeenth century character. It is a two-storey building with attics, mostly built of local limestone and with sandstone window surrounds and slate roofs. It is now H-shaped but would have been T-shaped at an earlier date. Some of the windows are mullioned and there is a coat of arms over the main doorway. The staircase is late sixteenth century and stands at the rear of the hallway, and the finest room is the panelled parlour.

The manor was designated as a Grade I listed building on 16 December 1952. The reason for the listing was stated as "Listed grade I for its exceptional interest as one of Glamorgan's finest country houses retaining sub-medieval internal detail of the highest quality." Some of the outbuildings are listed as Grade II listed buildings, including the pheasant house and the pigeon house.

The house is set in six acres of gardens and woodland. The west wing of the property is used for domestic rental.
