= Cowbridge town wall =

Medieval wall in Wales

Coordinates: 51.4617°N 3.4517°W

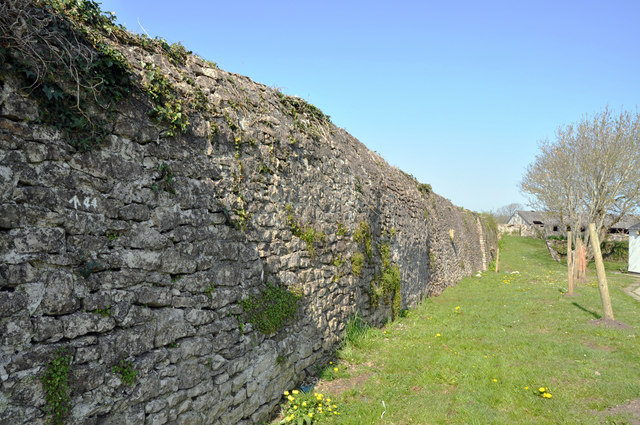
Cowbridge town wall

Cowbridge town wall is a Grade II*-listed medieval wall in the small market town of Cowbridge in the Vale of Glamorgan, south Wales. The walls were built by about 1300. It is believed that the purpose of the wall was to protect the Lord of Glamorgan's burgage plots and to provide a way of collecting tolls from the town's market, held twice-weekly. The wall has been altered several times throughout its existence.

== History ==
The wall was built by about 1300 in Cowbridge, Vale of Glamorgan, south Wales. It is believed that the purpose of the wall was to protect the Lord of Glamorgan's burgage plots (rental property) and to provide a way of collecting tolls from the town's market, held twice-weekly. The wall originally had four gates. The North is believed to have been to first to be removed, before the 18th century, followed by the West Gate in 1754 and the East Gate in 1771. Only the South Gate remains intact today. The South Gate and surrounding area is well-preserved, with two angle towers still intact. The Royal Commission on the Ancient and Historical Monuments of Wales summarises it as the "remains of a stone curtain, describing a pentagonal figure about the central part of the borough of Cowbridge".

The wall is 7.7 metres (25 ft) high, with an outside batter and walk inside which is 4.3 metres (14 ft) wide. It was subject to excavation in 1981–1982. In 2004 the local council attached a blue plaque to the wall, which reads: "The Town Wall is now unique in Glamorgan. It was built by 1300 to enclose the "New Town" of Cowbridge".

Alterations were made to the south-west bastion around the time of the demolition of the West Gate and the landscaping of the gardens of Old Hall, formerly the town house of the Edmondes family. A walkway and summer house were constructed at this time, and mock crenellations were added.

== Archaeology ==
An archaeological study was carried out in 1998 on the instructions of the Vale of Glamorgan Council to establish their age as part of a survey to assess their current condition, and it was estimated that the major portion of the south and west walls was medieval in date. Volunteer work to remove vegetation from the walls led to further excavations being carried out in 2007 and 2010, and it was discovered that much of the wall above ground level had been rebuilt in the 18th century on the medieval foundations.

== Restoration ==
A small section of the west wall collapsed during 2008/2009, leading to repairs being carried out on the masonry, using the original stone where possible but complying with modern building standards. The restoration work was completed in 2011.

Further test excavations in an area just outside the walls took place in 2018, before plans for a modern market building on the site were rejected by the Vale of Glamorgan Council, allowing more of the space adjacent to the walls to be used for parking. In 2019, corrugated metal sheds that had abutted the west wall since the introduction of a cattle market in that area at the turn of the 20th century were removed, leaving most of the wall visible from the road.

== Gallery ==
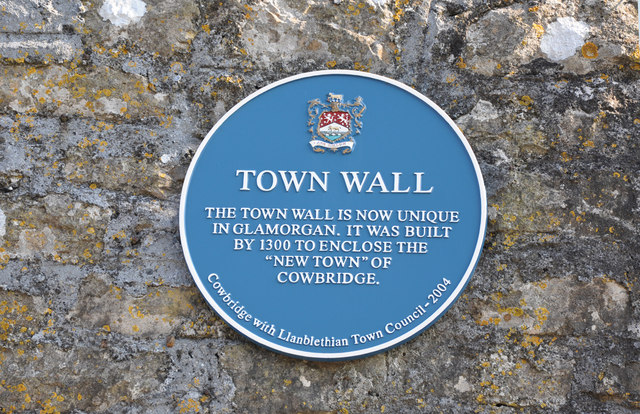
Blue plaque

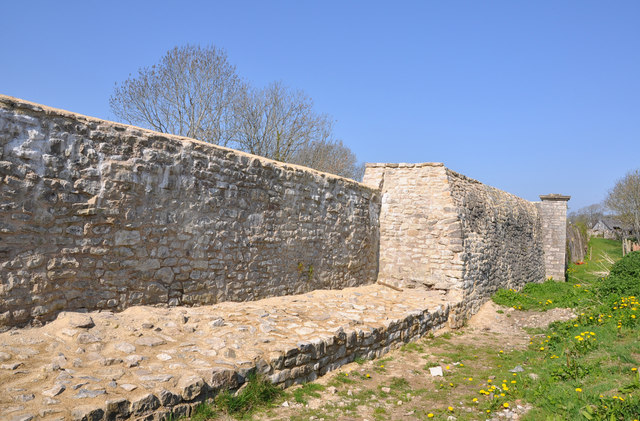
Restoration of the old town wall

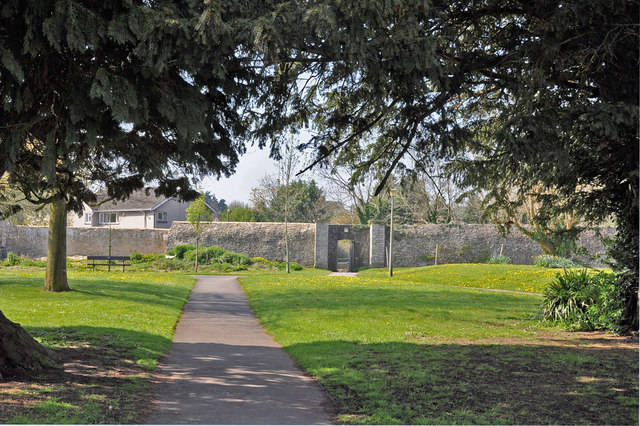
Town wall and gateway into Old Hall

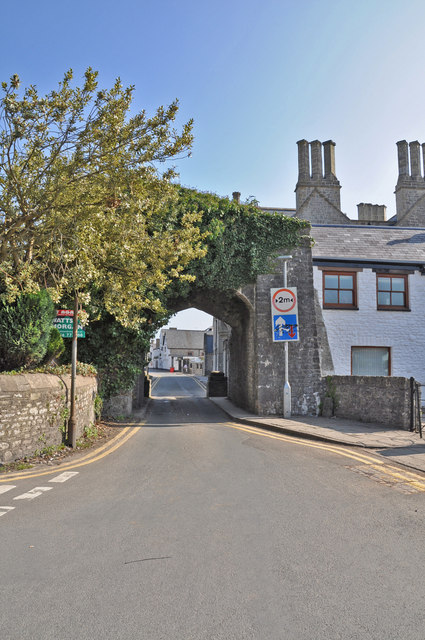
The South Gate

== See also ==
- List of town walls in England and Wales
