= Gileston Manor =

Manor and country house in Vale of Glamorgan, Wales

Coordinates: 51°23′39″N 3°24′48″W

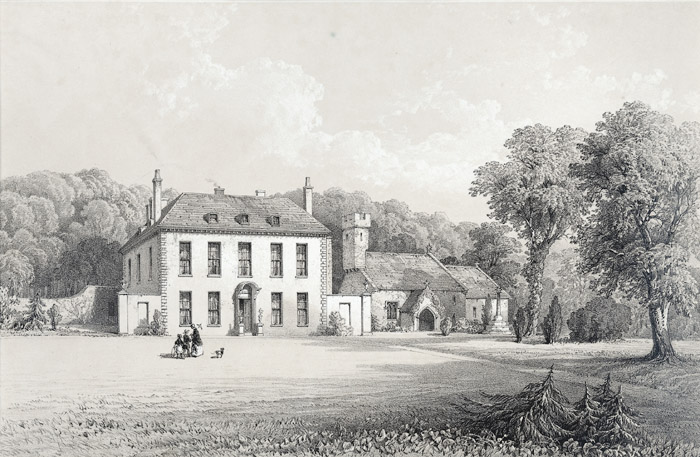
Gileston Manor and church, c. 1840

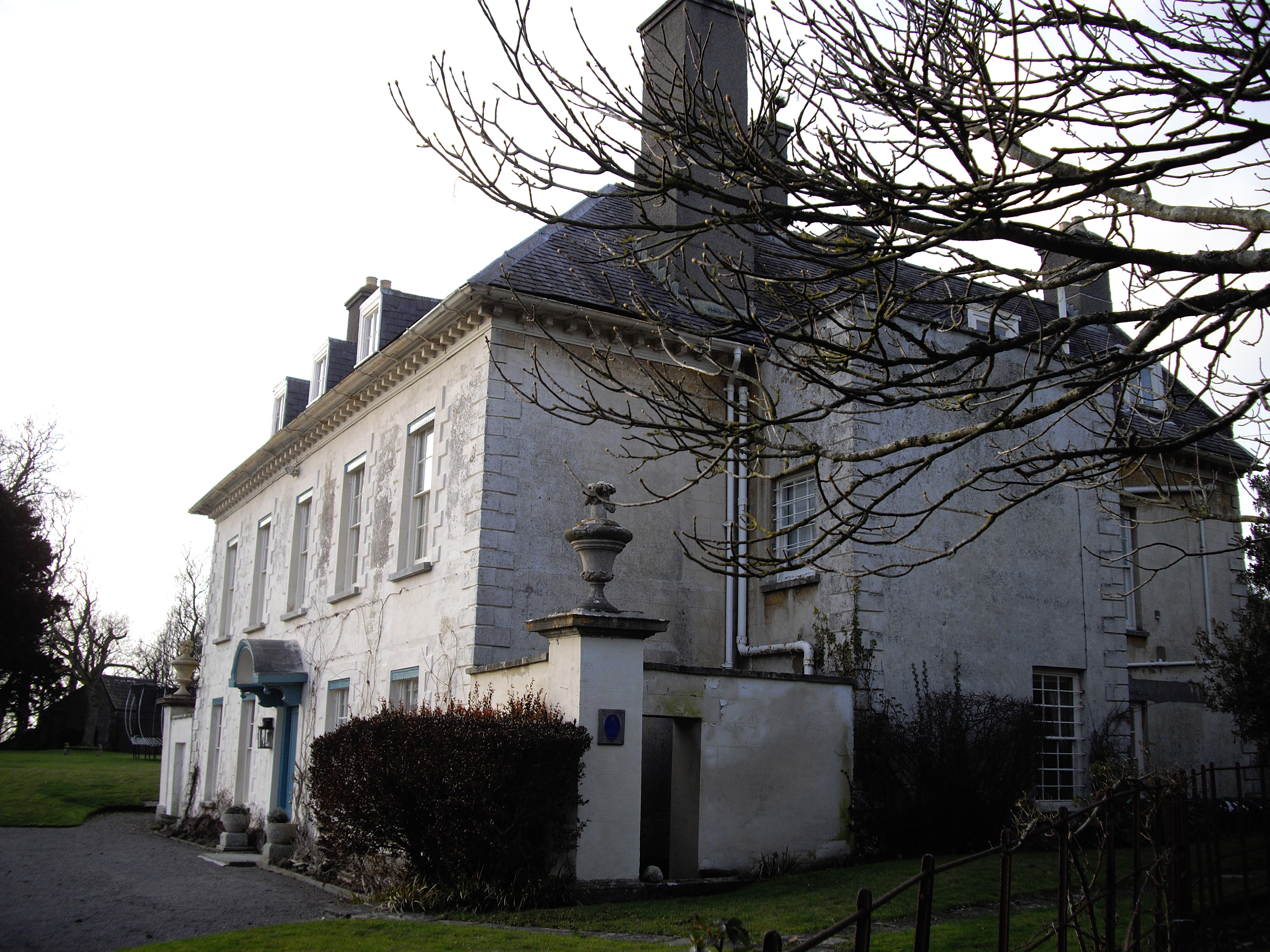
Gileston Manor viewed from the southeast

Gileston Manor is a manor and country house located in the small village of Gileston near St Athan, Vale of Glamorgan, Wales.

== History and description ==
The house contains remnants of a late medieval building, but the exterior and some of the internal fittings date from the 18th century. The building is square in plan and has two main storeys, as well as an attic and cellars. A wide staircase occupies the middle of the house while the front bedrooms are lined with 18th-century wall panelling. The west wing is the oldest part of the building, with roof trussess suggesting it dates to the early 1500s. The exterior south (front) façade is a later remodelling of the early 1700s, with a symmetrical arrangement of windows and a hipped roof. The house has a large 18th-century walled garden and summer house.

The manor is believed to have been held by a family with the surname Jule or Giles, until the last male heir died in 1673. The house was then passed on to two female heiresses and subsequently, during the 18th century, was occupied by a succession of village clerics. For example, in 1771 the Bishop of Llandaff recorded that the village population consisted of a farmer, his wife, son and servants, an old man and an old woman, while the rector and his family was also the squire and occupants of the manor house.

The manor house became a Grade II* listed building in 1952.

In 2009, the house and grounds were reported to be on sale with an asking price of £2.5 million.
