= List of scheduled monuments in the Vale of Glamorgan =

The Vale of Glamorgan county borough is a rural and agricultural area of south Wales. With 110 scheduled monuments, evenly spread across the borough, it is an area with a high density of such sites. Forty-one sites date to prehistoric times, including three neolithic tombs, eighteen round barrows and sixteen Iron Age hill forts. The four Roman sites include two Roman Villas, and there are seven pre-Norman medieval sites, mainly chapels and crosses. It is the 52 medieval monuments that provide some of the most visible remains. There are seven castles and a further eighteen defensive locations. There are also eight religious sites, including crosses, a chantry and a priory. Unusually, four of the six post-medieval sites are 20th-century structures, being World War II defences. All of the Vale of Glamorgan administrative area lies within the historic county of Glamorgan.

Scheduled monuments have statutory protection. The compilation of the list is undertaken by Cadw Welsh Historic Monuments, which is an executive agency of the National Assembly of Wales. The list of scheduled monuments below is supplied by Cadw with additional material from RCAHMW and Glamorgan-Gwent Archaeological Trust.

== Scheduled monuments in the Vale of Glamorgan ==
Image	Name	Site type	Community	Location	Details	Period	SAM No & Refs
	Coed-y-Cwm Chambered Cairn	Chambered tomb	St Nicholas and Bonvilston	51.4556°N 3.324°W, ST081737	Limestone slabs excavated in 1936. There is doubt that the stones are manmade, but a stone axe was found, showing neolithic activity at the site.	Prehistoric (Neolithic)	GM116
Stone burial chamber at Tinkinswood	Tinkinswood Burial Chamber	Chambered long barrow	St Nicholas and Bonvilston	51.4513°N 3.3072°W, ST092732	Chambered long cairn with stone walling and a megalithic chamber. Excavation in 1914 found disarticulated bones from at least 50 individuals. The site is in the care of Cadw, and accessible to the public.	Prehistoric (Neolithic)	GM009
St Lythan's stone burial chamber	St Lythans Burial Chamber	Chambered long barrow	Wenvoe	51.4426°N 3.2951°W, ST100723	Also known as the Maesyfelin Chambered Long Cairn, and Gwal y Filiast (The Greyhound's Kennel), this was once a mound 25 m (80 ft) long, of which only the chamber at east is end now visible. The massive capstone weighs an estimated 35 tons. It is in the care of Cadw, and accessible to the public.	Prehistoric (Neolithic)	GM008
	Two Cooking Mounds E of Ty'n-y-Pwll	Burnt mound	Pendoylan	51.4719°N 3.3393°W, ST070756		Prehistoric	GM365
	Round Barrow 612m N of Bendrick Rock	Round barrow	Barry	51.399°N 3.2505°W, ST131674		Prehistoric	GM310
	Westward Corner Round Barrow	Round barrow	Barry	51.3939°N 3.307°W, ST091669		Prehistoric	GM360
	Round Barrow 800m SE of Malborough Grange	Round barrow	Cowbridge with Llanblethian	51.4474°N 3.4698°W, SS979730		Prehistoric	GM292
	Round Barrows N of Breach Farm	Round barrow	Cowbridge with Llanblethian	51.4545°N 3.4835°W, SS970738		Prehistoric	GM104
	Stalling Down Round Barrow	Round barrow	Cowbridge with Llanblethian	51.4645°N 3.4241°W, ST012749		Prehistoric	GM230
	Corntown causewayed enclosure	Causewayed enclosure	Ewenny	51.4766°N 3.5476°W, SS926764		Prehistoric	GM585
	Domen Fawr Round Barrows	Round barrow	Llan-maes	51.4292°N 3.4612°W, SS985710		Prehistoric	GM189
	Walterston ringwork	Enclosure	Llancarfan	51.4321°N 3.3417°W, ST068712		Prehistoric	GM251
	Morfa House Round Barrow	Round barrow	Llantwit Major	51.4202°N 3.4976°W, SS959700		Prehistoric	GM188
	Heol y Mynydd Round Barrow	Round barrow	St Brides Major	51.4641°N 3.6078°W, SS884751	Bracken-covered mound near the roadside at Heol y Mynydd	Prehistoric	GM242
	Croes Heol y Splott Round Barrow	Round barrow	St Donats	51.4245°N 3.5163°W, SS946705		Prehistoric	GM187
	Nash Point Round Barrows	Round barrow	St Donats	51.4111°N 3.562°W, SS914691		Prehistoric	GM114
	Round Barrows NE of Church Farm	Round barrow	St Donats	51.4249°N 3.5517°W, SS922706		Prehistoric	GM262
	Round Barrows South of Monkton	Round barrow	St Donats	51.4248°N 3.5375°W, SS931706		Prehistoric	GM109
	Round Barrows W of Cant-Erw	Round barrow	St Donats	51.4309°N 3.5331°W, SS935713		Prehistoric	GM111
	St-y-Nyll Round Barrow	Round barrow	St Georges-super-Ely	51.4964°N 3.2967°W, ST100782		Prehistoric	GM204
	Maes-y-Hwyaid Round Barrow	Round barrow	Welsh St Donats	51.4658°N 3.3888°W, ST036750		Prehistoric	GM321
	Two Round Barrows 300m North of Tair Onnen	Round barrow	Welsh St Donats	51.4651°N 3.3811°W, ST041749		Prehistoric	GM390
	Greave Round Barrow	Round barrow	Wenvoe	51.4512°N 3.2606°W, ST124732		Prehistoric	GM183
	Rhyle Round Barrow	Round barrow	Wick	51.4423°N 3.5604°W, SS916726		Prehistoric	GM181
	Caer Dynnaf hillfort	Hillfort	Cowbridge with Llanblethian	51.4581°N 3.4641°W, SS983742		Prehistoric	GM100
	Llanquian Wood Camp	Hillfort	Cowbridge with Llanblethian	51.4607°N 3.4096°W, ST021744		Prehistoric	GM182
	Castell Moel	Hillfort	Llancarfan	51.4521°N 3.3624°W, ST054734		Prehistoric	GM298
	Castle Ditches	Hillfort	Llancarfan	51.4214°N 3.3546°W, ST059700		Prehistoric	GM071
	Llantrithyd Camp	Enclosure	Llancarfan	51.4494°N 3.3849°W, ST038731		Prehistoric	GM257
	Llanvithyn Camp	Hillfort	Llancarfan	51.4374°N 3.3615°W, ST054718		Prehistoric	GM293
	Mynydd Bychan	Settlement	Llandow	51.4699°N 3.4942°W, SS963756		Prehistoric	GM076
	Castle Ditches Camp	Hillfort	Llantwit Major	51.3967°N 3.4961°W, SS960674		Prehistoric	GM019
	Summerhouse Camp	Hillfort	Llantwit Major	51.3885°N 3.4461°W, SS994664		Prehistoric	GM032
	The Bulwarks Camp	Hillfort	Rhoose	51.3887°N 3.3208°W, ST081663		Prehistoric	GM029
Trwyn y Witch headland, with the hillfort on its summit.	Dunraven Castle Hillfort	Hillfort	St Brides Major	51.4425°N 3.6025°W, SS887727	Promontary fort at the top of 60 metres (200 ft) sea-cliffs, on the Southerndown Coast. The distinctive headland is known as Trwyn y Witch. Half of the ramparts and interior are lost to coastal erosion. Later castle buildings have also erased parts of the earthworks. 21 roundhouse sites are located within the fort.	Prehistoric; Iron Age	GM350
	Promontory Fort on Fleming's Down	Promontory Fort - inland	St Brides Major	51.4794°N 3.6009°W, SS889768	Bank and ditch across a high promontary overlooking the Ewenny and Ogmore valleys.	Prehistoric; Iron Age	GM466
	Cwm Nash Defended Enclosure	Promontory Fort - inland	St Donats	51.4218°N 3.5711°W, SS908703		Prehistoric	GM614
	Nash Point Camp	Hillfort	St Donats	51.4049°N 3.5609°W, SS915684		Prehistoric	GM033
	Y Gaer	Ringwork	St Nicholas and Bonvilston	51.4638°N 3.3496°W, ST063747		Prehistoric	GM079
	Sully Island, "Danish" Fort	Hillfort	Sully	51.3957°N 3.1965°W, ST168669		Prehistoric	GM035
	Cwm Bach Camps	Hillfort	Wick	51.4339°N 3.5876°W, SS897717		Prehistoric	GM186
	Knap Roman Site	Villa	Barry	51.3905°N 3.2961°W, ST099665		Roman	GM419
	Romano-British Farmstead, Dinas Powys Common	Settlement	Dinas Powys	51.4311°N 3.2224°W, ST151709		Roman	GM431
	Moulton Roman Site	Building (Unclassified)	Llancarfan	51.4177°N 3.3332°W, ST073695		Roman	GM253
	Caermead Roman Site	Villa	Llantwit Major	51.419°N 3.4991°W, SS958699		Roman	GM020
	St Barruch's Chapel	Chapel	Barry	51.3923°N 3.2672°W, ST119666		Early Medieval	GM120
	Llancarfan Monastery (Site of)	Monastery	Llancarfan	51.4215°N 3.3653°W, ST051700		Early Medieval	GM075
	Pillar-Cross in Llandough Churchyard	Cross	Llandough, Penarth	51.4522°N 3.1988°W, ST168732		Early Medieval	GM209
	Llangan Celtic Cross	Cross	Llangan	51.4898°N 3.5031°W, SS957778	Located near the west wall of St Canna's Church in Llangan a disc-headed cross slab, 1.3 m high, depicting the crucifixion, 9th or 10th century; set in a stone within an open shelter.	Early Medieval	GM211
	Cwm George Camp	Earthwork (unclassified)	Michaelston	51.4427°N 3.2272°W, ST148722		Early Medieval	GM023
	Tyn y Coed Earthwork	Earthwork (unclassified)	Michaelston	51.4407°N 3.2258°W, ST148720		Unknown	GM024
	Croes Antoni	Cross	St Brides Major	51.4648°N 3.5946°W, SS893751	Weathered socket stone, probably from a pre-Norman cross.	Early Medieval	GM333
Barry Castle	Barry Castle	Manor	Barry	51.3966°N 3.2939°W, ST100671		Medieval	GM135
	Highlight Church, Remains of	Church	Barry	51.4208°N 3.3003°W, ST096698		Medieval	GM344
	Highlight Medieval House Site	House (domestic)	Barry	51.4197°N 3.2951°W, ST100697		Medieval	GM301
	Site of Medieval Mill & Mill Leat Cliffwood	Mill	Barry	51.3943°N 3.3114°W, ST088669		Medieval	GM446
	Llanquian Castle	Motte	Cowbridge with Llanblethian	51.4601°N 3.4135°W, ST018744		Medieval	GM225
	South Gate	Gatehouse	Cowbridge with Llanblethian	51.4612°N 3.4505°W, SS993745		Medieval	GM136
Saint Quentin's Castle	St Quentin's Castle, Llanblethian	Castle	Cowbridge with Llanblethian	51.4576°N 3.4564°W, SS989741		Medieval	GM094
	Dinas Powis Castle	Castle	Dinas Powys	51.4374°N 3.2203°W, ST152716		Medieval	GM021
Ewenny Priory Church	Ewenny Priory	Priory	Ewenny	51.4888°N 3.5676°W, SS912778		Medieval	GM190
	Horseland moated homestead	Moated Site	Llancarfan	51.4424°N 3.3819°W, ST040723		Medieval	GM388
	Llancadle Deserted Medieval Village	Deserted Medieval Village	Llancarfan	51.4042°N 3.3888°W, ST034681		Medieval	GM534
	Medieval House Site, Llantrithyd	Enclosure - Domestic	Llancarfan	51.4453°N 3.375°W, ST045727		Medieval	GM282
	Llandow Castle-Ringwork	Ringwork	Llandow	51.4477°N 3.5241°W, SS941731		Medieval	GM515
	Llandough Castle, Remains of Hall	Castle	Llanfair	51.447°N 3.4476°W, SS995729		Medieval	GM337
Beaupre Castle Gatehouse	Old Beaupre Castle	House (domestic)	Llanfair	51.4385°N 3.4274°W, ST008720		Medieval	GM001
	St Mary Hill cross	Cross	Llangan	51.503°N 3.5028°W, SS957793	Medieval cross head in the Churchyard at St Mary Hill, north of Llangan. Original carved canopied figures are on each side of the head. The socket stone and the shaft are not original.	Medieval	GM224
	Medieval Cross in Churchyard	Cross	Llangan	51.4896°N 3.5029°W, SS957778	Church Cross at St Canna's Church in Llangan. Set on a four-step base with cross-shaft and sculptured head, possibly 15th century.	Medieval	GM210
	Ringwork & Bailey at Gelligarn	Ringwork	Llangan	51.4975°N 3.4988°W, SS960786		Medieval	GM377
	Bedford Castle	Motte	Llantwit Major	51.4136°N 3.468°W, SS980693		Medieval	GM113
Boverton Place	Boverton Place	House (domestic)	Llantwit Major	51.4049°N 3.4641°W, SS982683	Built by Robert Fitzhamon and rebuilt 1598 by Roger Seys, Attorney General for Wales.	Medieval	GM422
Ruins of Llantwit Major	Llantwit Major Castle	Manor	Llantwit Major	51.411°N 3.488°W, SS966690	Ruin of an Elizabethan manor house, built by Griffith Williams for his daughter and son-in-law Edmund Vann in 1596.	Medieval	GM137
Domed dovecote at Llantwit Major Monastery	Llantwit Major Dovecot	Dovecote	Llantwit Major	51.407°N 3.4887°W, SS965686	Dove Cote covered by a domical vault and 13th-century cylindrical column close, to St Illtuds Church, next to the site of the old tithe barn, built for the monks at the St. Illtud's monastery.	Medieval	GM140
Gatehouse to the Grange, Llantwit Major	Llantwit Major Gatehouse	Gatehouse	Llantwit Major	51.4075°N 3.4886°W, SS965686	Gatehouse to the monastic grange at Llantwit Major	Medieval	GM141
	Llantwit Major Monastic Settlement (Site of)	Grange	Llantwit Major	51.4078°N 3.4894°W, SS965686	Foundations, excavated in 1912, of utilititarian buildings associated with a large monastic establishment.	Medieval	GM142
Llantwit Major Chantry	The Chantry House	Chantry	Llantwit Major	51.4077°N 3.4877°W, SS966686		Medieval	GM490
	Leckwith Bridge	Bridge	Michaelston, (also Canton), (see also Cardiff)	51.4699°N 3.212°W, ST159752		Medieval	GM014
	Cogan Deserted Medieval Village	Deserted Medieval Village	Penarth	51.428°N 3.1948°W, ST170405		Medieval	GM535
	Penarth Churchyard Cross (Now in St Augustine's Church)	Cross	Penarth	51.4415°N 3.1689°W, ST188720		Medieval	GM227
	Felin Isaf Castle Mound	Motte	Pendoylan	51.5045°N 3.3547°W, ST060792		Medieval	GM370
	Ystradowen Castle Mound	Motte	Penllyn	51.4891°N 3.4262°W, ST010776		Medieval	GM228
	Remains of Peterston Castle	Castle	Peterston-super-Ely	51.479°N 3.3212°W, ST083763		Medieval	GM450
Penmark Castle, seen from the churchyard	Penmark Castle	Castle	Rhoose	51.4113°N 3.355°W, ST058689		Medieval	GM229
	Deserted Medieval Village North East of Rock Farm	Deserted Medieval Village	St Athan	51.4039°N 3.4092°W, ST020681		Medieval	GM307
	East Orchard Manor House	Manor	St Athan	51.4032°N 3.3977°W, ST028680		Medieval	GM082
	Fleminston Deserted Village	Deserted Medieval Village	St Athan	51.4188°N 3.4027°W, ST025697		Medieval	GM300
	West Aberthaw Medieval Site	Settlement	St Athan	51.3918°N 3.4043°W, ST023668		Medieval	GM297
	West Orchard Manor House	Manor	St Athan	51.4035°N 3.4285°W, ST007681		Medieval	GM083
Ogmore Castle	Ogmore Castle	Castle	St Brides Major	51.4805°N 3.6115°W, SS881769	Construction from 1116 or earlier, it includes one of the earliest stone keeps in Wales. Now a spectacular ruin between the Ogmore and Ewenny rivers.	Medieval	GM037
Stepping Stones on River Ogmore	Ogmore Stepping Stones	Stepping stones	St Brides Major, (also Merthyr Mawr), (see also Bridgend)	51.4808°N 3.6122°W, SS881769	Rare survival of a complete stepping-stone crossing. 33 rectangular blocks span the river Ewenny hear Ogmore Castle.	Medieval	GM184
	St Bride's Major Churchyard Cross	Cross	St Brides Major	51.4633°N 3.593°W, SS894750	Base of six steps, a socket stone and tapering shaft, in St Bridget's Churchyard.	Medieval	GM174
	Stepsau Duon	Stepping stones	St Brides Major	51.4695°N 3.5722°W, SS908756	Also called Stepson Downs, these are 15 stone steps across the Afon Alun, alongside a ford near Castle-upon-Afon.	Medieval	GM185
	Area of Shrunken Medieval Village	Shrunken Medieval Village	St Donats	51.414°N 3.5452°W, SS926694		Medieval	GM375
	St Donat's Churchyard Cross	Cross	St Donats	51.4014°N 3.5343°W, SS933680		Medieval	GM361
Farmhouse and ruins at Monknash	Tithe Barn, Dovecot & remains at Monknash	Barn	St Donats	51.4247°N 3.5571°W, SS918706		Medieval	GM143
	Castle Ringwork 850m ENE of Ty'n-y-Coed	Ringwork	St Nicholas & Bonvilston	51.4517°N 3.3386°W, ST070733		Medieval	GM613
	Coed y Cwm Ringwork	Ringwork	St Nicholas and Bonvilston	51.4546°N 3.3215°W, ST082736		Medieval	GM117
	Cottrell Castle Mound	Motte	St Nicholas and Bonvilston	51.462°N 3.3244°W, ST080745		Medieval	GM364
	Cottrell Ringwork	Ringwork	St Nicholas and Bonvilston	51.4641°N 3.3188°W, ST084747		Medieval	GM096
	Doghill Moated Site, Dyffryn	Moated Site	St Nicholas and Bonvilston	51.4393°N 3.3069°W, ST092719		Medieval	GM069
	Middleton Moated Site	Moated Site	Sully	51.4102°N 3.2229°W, ST150686		Medieval	GM378
	Castell Tal-y-Fan	Castle	Welsh St Donats	51.4851°N 3.4114°W, ST020771		Medieval	GM421
	Buarth-Mawr Barn	Barn	Wick	51.4383°N 3.5517°W, SS922721		Medieval	GM148
	Llantrithyd Place: remains of house, relict gardens and wells	House (domestic)	Llancarfan	51.4456°N 3.3777°W, ST043727		Post-Medieval/Modern	GM555
	Early Cement Works, Aberthaw	Industrial building	Rhoose	51.386°N 3.3835°W, ST038661		Post-Medieval/Modern	GM318
	Treguff RAF Airfield Decoy Control Centre	Decoy	Llancarfan	51.4289°N 3.3955°W, SO030709		Post-Medieval/Modern	GM604
	East Orchard Wood Pillbox	Pillbox	St Athan	51.3996°N 3.3973°W, ST028676		Post-Medieval/Modern	GM598
	Limpert Bay Anti-invasion Defences	Anti-invasion defence site	St Athan	51.3887°N 3.4384°W, ST000665		Post-Medieval/Modern	GM601
	Anti-aircraft and Coastal Battery W of Lavernock Point	Battery	Sully	51.4044°N 3.1795°W, ST180679		Post-Medieval/Modern	GM448

Scheduled monuments in the Vale of Glamorgan, Wales.
=Prehistoric =Roman =Early Medieval
=Medieval =Post-Medieval/Modern

== See also ==
- List of Cadw properties
- List of castles in Wales
- List of hill forts in Wales
- Historic houses in Wales
- List of monastic houses in Wales
- List of museums in Wales
- List of Roman villas in Wales
