= Marcross =

Village in the Vale of Glamorgan, Wales

Coordinates: 51.412°N 3.549°W

Marcross: Welsh: Marcroes
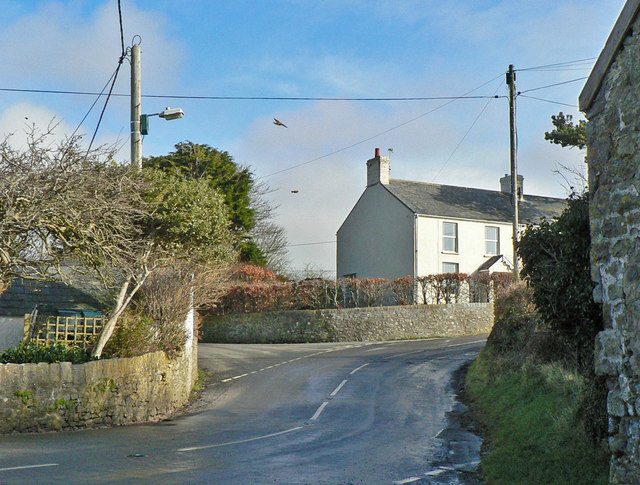
- Crossroads at Marcross

- Location within the Vale of Glamorgan
- OS grid reference: SS924692
- Principal area: Vale of Glamorgan
- Preserved county: South Glamorgan
- Country: Wales
- Sovereign state: United Kingdom
- Postcode district: CF
- Police: South Wales
- Fire: South Wales
- Ambulance: Welsh
- UK Parliament: Vale of Glamorgan
- Senedd Cymru – Welsh Parliament: Vale of Glamorgan

Marcross (Welsh: Marcroes) is a small village in the rural community of St Donats in the Vale of Glamorgan, south Wales. It consists of a public house (the Horseshoe Inn) and a few scattered houses, farms, and a small medieval church in the centre of the village.

== Holy Trinity Church ==
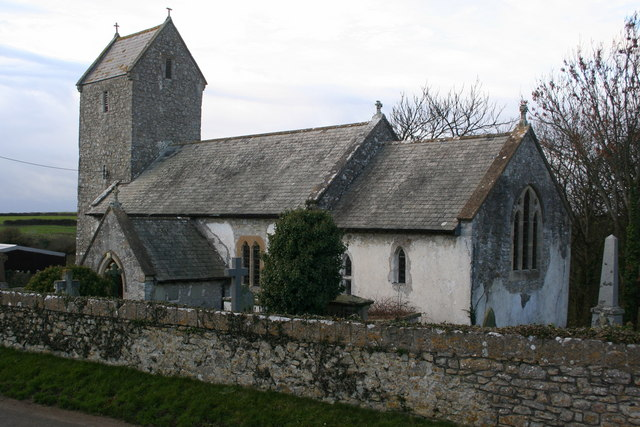
Church of the Holy Trinity, Marcross

The Church of the Holy Trinity dates from the 12th century and is a Grade I listed building. The church retains many of its Norman features, including a large font, an excellent chancel arch and a pair of intriguing corbels who guard the south doorway. A small window hides among the ivy on the south wall of the chancel, a lepers' window from where the afflicted could partake in services. Holy Trinity was restored at the turn of the twentieth century, with work including a new roof, pulpit and altar, but the whole building still retains traces of the whitewash that once covered many local churches. Possibly the most interesting feature is the huge Norman font, decorated with roll-moulding. The saddle-back, west, tower was probably added during the 14th century. Since the church appears to be in need of repairs, particularly after a series of spring storms in 2016, a village fund raiser was held at the Horseshoe Inn in May 2016, to help with the costs of the work.

== Nash Point Lighthouse ==
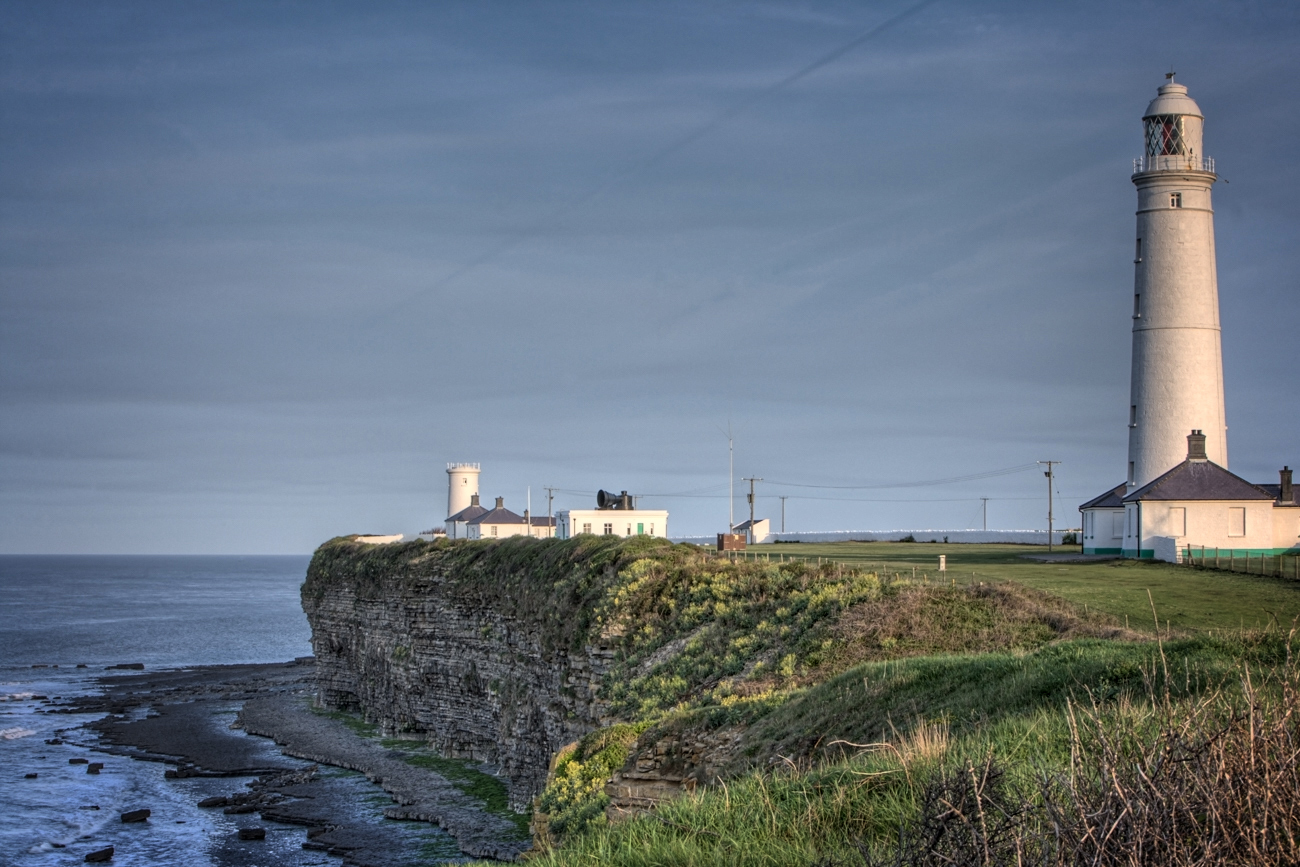
Lighthouse complex at Nash Point

Nash Point Lighthouse is a Grade II listed building, and was the last staffed lighthouse in Wales; the last keepers left on 5 August 1998. Today, the lighthouse's automatic operation is monitored by Trinity House's control centre at Harwich in Essex. The station was built between 1831 and 1832, of blue lias stone winched up from the beach below. The foundations for both the low and high towers were laid in October 1831, with both of the towers being constructed at the same time. Both towers went into operation on 1 September 1832.

While the sands were a danger to all ships in the area, it appears that the accident involving a passenger ship, the Frolic, in March 1831, was the driving force behind the rapid construction and completion of the towers. The engineering chief was Joseph Nelson and both towers exhibited a light, giving a clear set of leading lights for vessels sailing eastwards up the Bristol Channel, guiding them through the narrow channel between the rocky shore and the dangerous Nash Sands. During the 1920s the use of the low tower was discontinued and a red sector was placed in the lamp of the east tower, shining red over the sandbank.

The Keepers' cottages are now available for hire as holiday cottages and the lighthouse is regularly open to visitors during the summer season; the lighthouse itself is also a popular venue for weddings.
