= St Donats =

St Donats: Welsh: Sain Dunwyd
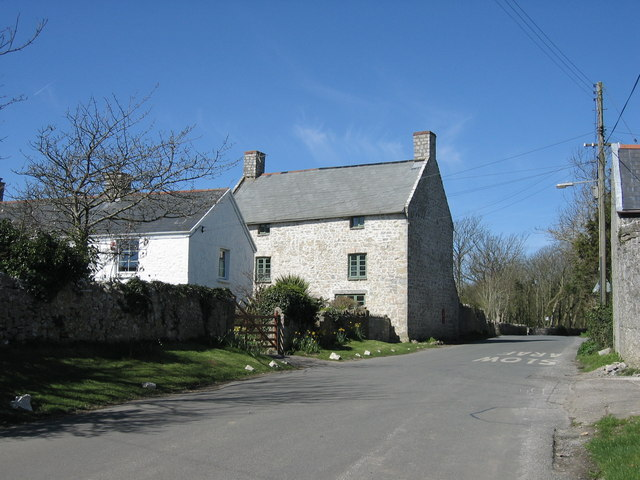
- St Donats village

- Location within the Vale of Glamorgan
- Population: 732 (2011)
- Principal area: Vale of Glamorgan
- Preserved county: South Glamorgan
- Country: Wales
- Sovereign state: United Kingdom
- Post town: Llantwit Major
- Postcode district: CF61
- Dialling code: 01446
- Police: South Wales
- Fire: South Wales
- Ambulance: Welsh
- UK Parliament: Vale of Glamorgan
- Senedd Cymru – Welsh Parliament: Vale of Glamorgan
- List of places UK Wales Vale of Glamorgan 51.4057°N 3.5306°W Map of the community

St Donats (Welsh: Sain Dunwyd) is a village and community in the Vale of Glamorgan in south Wales, located just west of the small town of Llantwit Major. The community includes the village of Marcross and the hamlets of Monknash and East and West Monkton. It is named after the 6th-century saint, Dunwyd, a friend of Saint Cadoc. It had a population of 732 in 2011.

St Donat's church, dedicated to St Dunwyd, lies in a depression and is unremarkable from the exterior but contains Stradling family monuments in the Stradling chapel. It is a 12th-century Grade I listed building with a Grade I listed medieval cross in the churchyard.

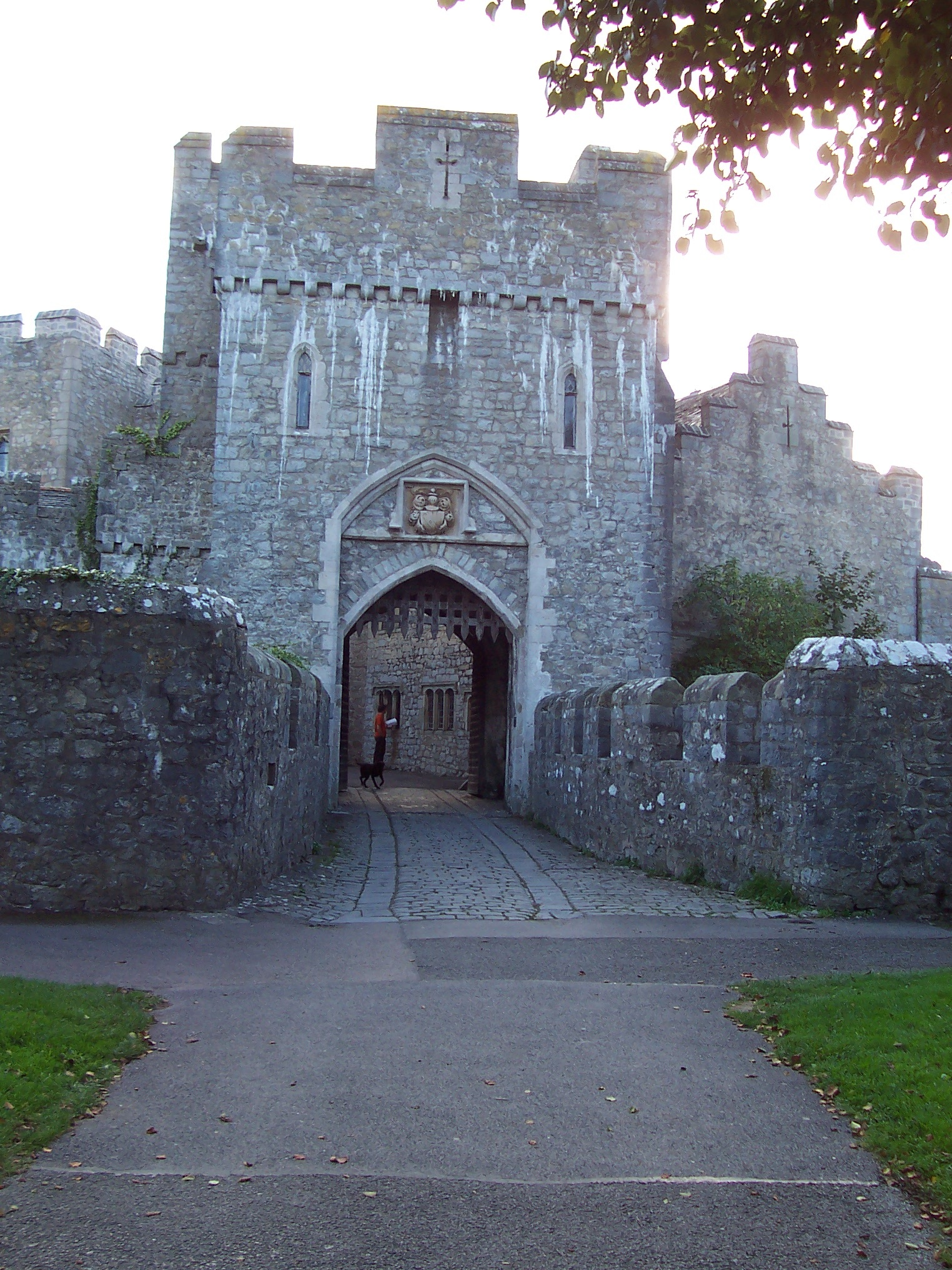
St Donat's Castle, now occupied by Atlantic College

The village is primarily known as the location of the 12th-century St Donat's Castle, which is now an international boarding school occupied by Atlantic College, the first of the United World Colleges. Within the castle grounds lies St Donats Arts Centre.

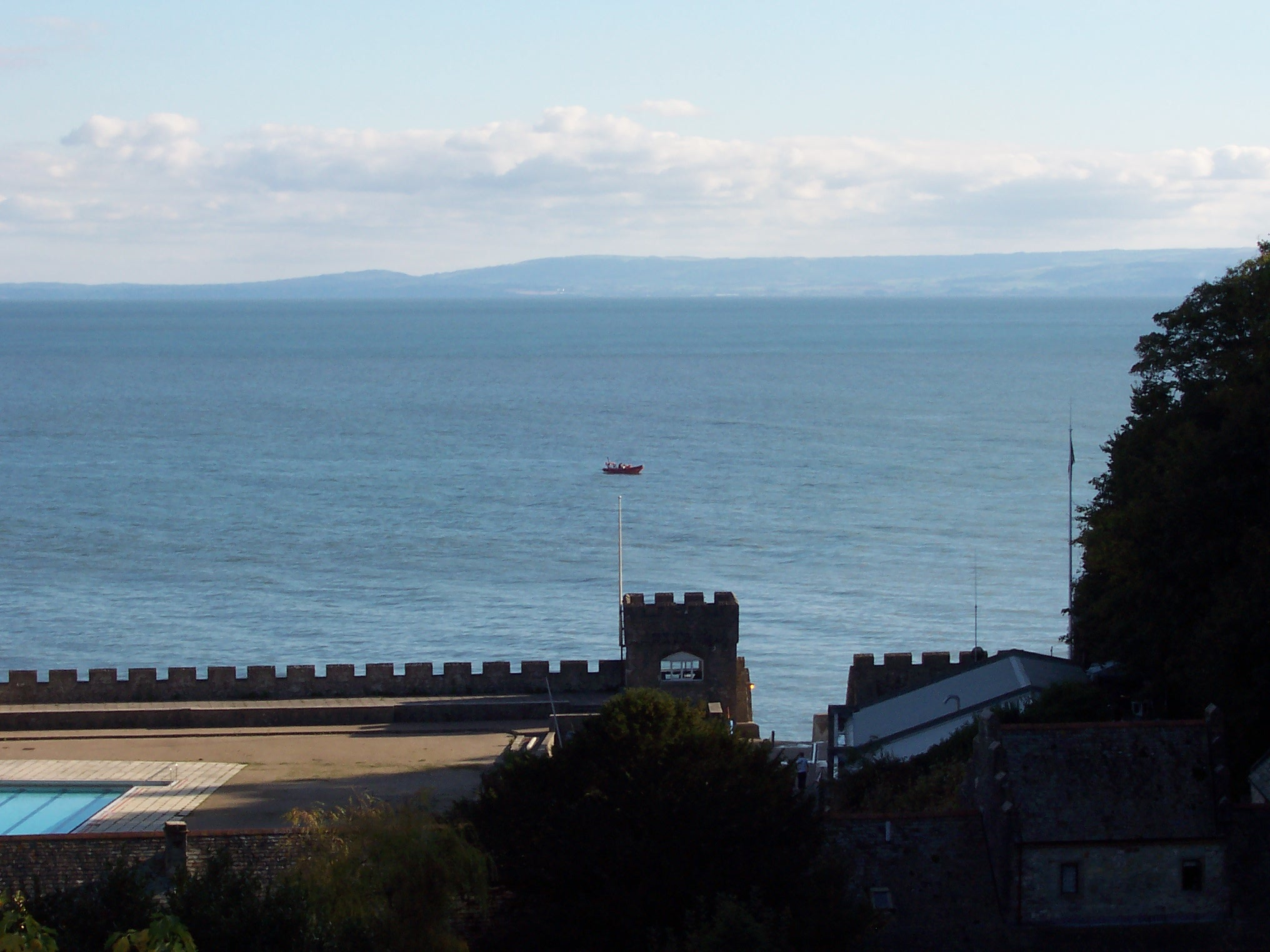
Sea views from the castle
