= Cycling in Cardiff =

Transport by bicycle in Cardiff, Wales

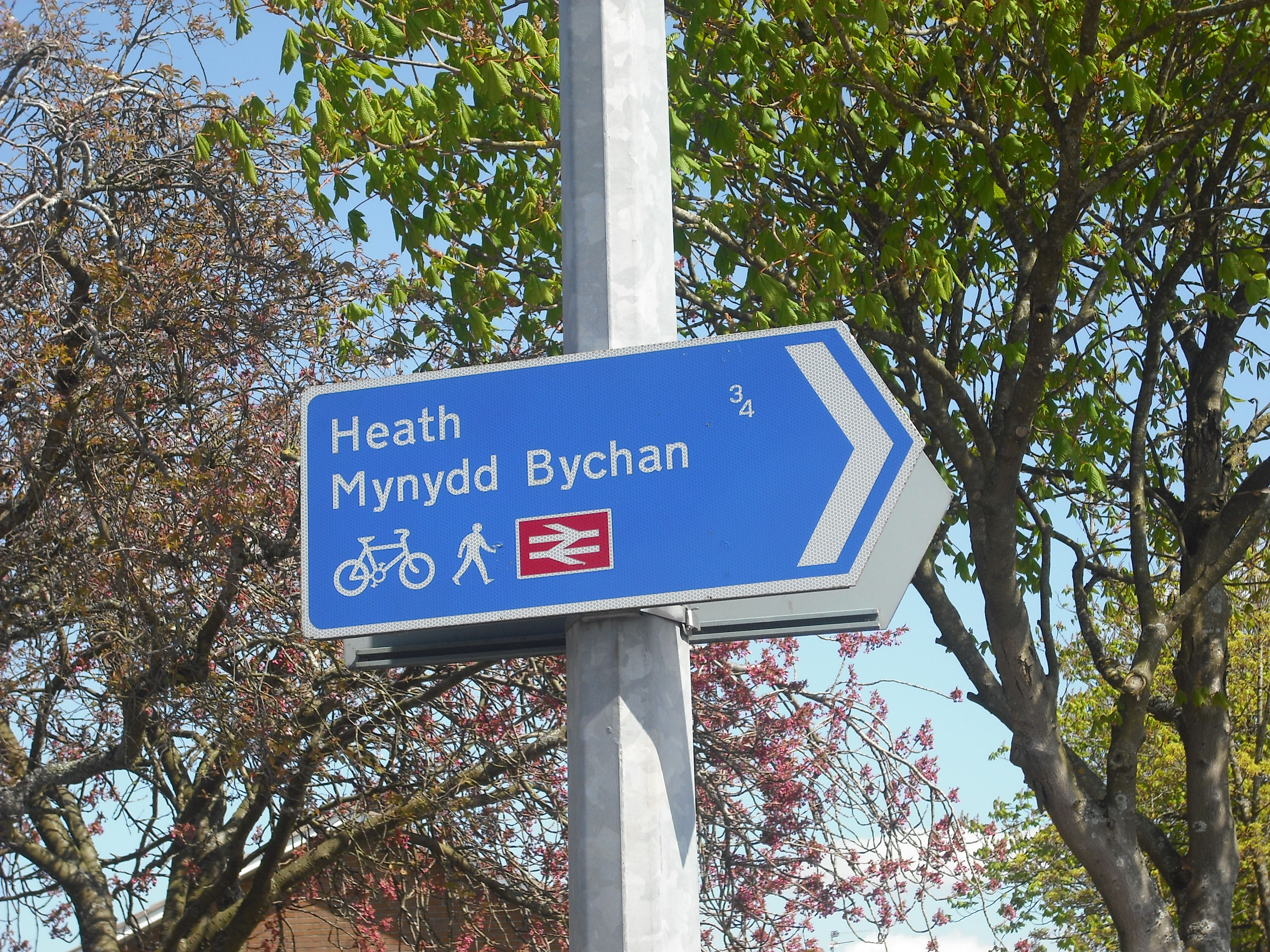
A directional sign for cyclists in Llanishen

Cycling in Cardiff, capital of Wales, is facilitated by its easy gradients and large parks. In the mid-2000s between 2.7% and 4.3% of people commuted to work by cycling in the city. In 2017 12.4% of workers cycled to work at least 5 days a week. However, cyclists in the city are deterred from cycling by poor facilities and aggressive traffic, according to research by Cardiff University.

As the busiest city, Cardiff is statistically the most dangerous place to cycle in Wales. Between 1999 and 2008, 1,000 cyclists were injured on the road, 20% of all cycling accidents in Wales, although the number of injuries to cyclists continues to fall.

The Cardiff cycle network is over 58 miles (94 km) long with an additional 3–6 miles (5–10 km) completed each year.

== Council policy ==
According to their Cycling Strategy (see below), Cardiff County Council aims to encourage citizens to cycle more, citing the improved health through increased fitness, reduced pollution and congestion of the local environment, economic gains through cycle tourism and leisure, independence for those people who cannot or do not wish to use a car, and the fact that cycling can be the quickest and most convenient form of transport in urban areas such as Cardiff. In 2002 they appointed a full-time Cycling Officer.

The council's Transport, Infrastructure and Waste service aims to ensure that an increase in cycling is matched with a reduction in the number of collisions involving cyclists.

Cardiff Council also provides off-road cycle training for school pupils to develop basic cycling skills based upon the National Cycling Proficiency Scheme. Training covers the Highway Code, negotiating obstacles, turning left and right, emergency stops and basic cycle maintenance. More than 1,500 children participate in this course every year in Cardiff, according to the council's Cycling Strategy.

The council produces a free map of the city, available from its offices or from cycle shops, highlighting cycle paths, lanes and suggested cycle routes.

=== Strategy ===
The council's Cycling Strategy was adopted in 1998. The 2007 update showed that 2.7% of people living in Cardiff cycled to work in 2001, an increase from 2.6% in 1991. However, an Omnibus survey showed that in 2003 and 2005, 3.6% and 4.3% of people cycled to work respectively. Although, the number of children cycling to school fell from 5% to 2% since 1989–91. In the strategy, the council intends to:

- encourage and promote cycling
- provide safe facilities such as wider cycle lanes and advanced stop lines at traffic signals
- conduct a trial scheme to assess the viability of allowing cycling through pedestrian areas in the city centre
- improve cycle links between residential and commercial areas
- facilitate integration with other modes of transport
- improve and maintain the cycle network
- develop and clearly sign routes

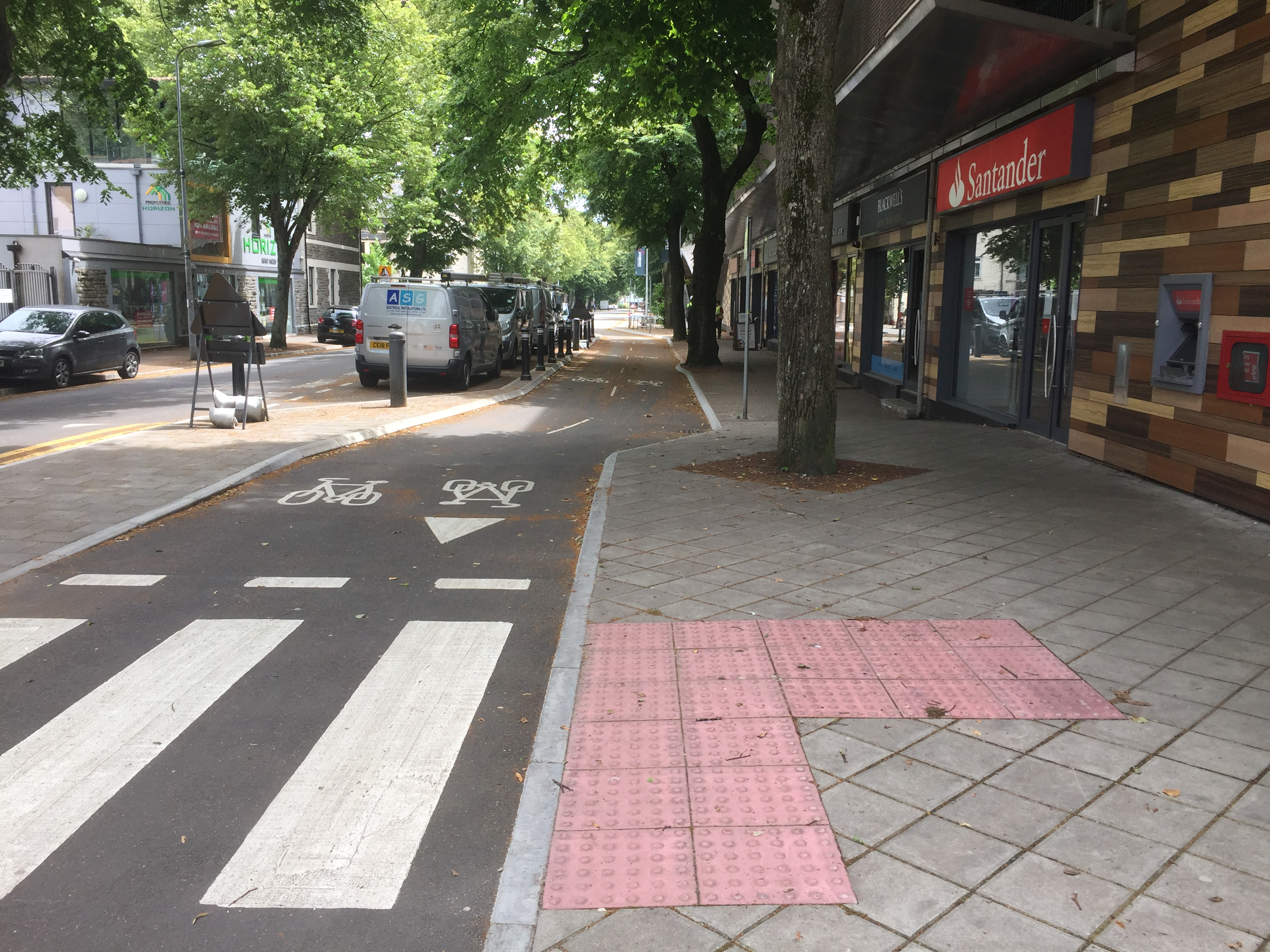
Looking down a completed section of Cycleway 1 on Senghenydd Road. This shows how parked cars are kept on the outside, providing a buffer between the cycle track and the main road. Plans for new cycleways are similar to this.

=== Cycleways ===
Cardiff Council are in the process of developing 5 cycleways across the city. This falls in line with its strategy to provide far more segregation from motorised traffic for cyclists.

While work on the routes has already broken ground, some have criticised both certain design flaws and how long it is taking for consultations to be published, with only two published within as many years. While some routes are essentially brand new, others are facelifts or changes of priority for current routes, such as Cycleway 3 on Lloyd George Avenue, and Cycleway 2 on Newport Road.

The proposed Cycleway routes are:

- Cycleway 1: City Centre to Cathays, University Hospital Wales, Heath High Level and Heath Low Level Rail Stations, and North East Cardiff Strategic Development Site
- Cycleway 2: City Centre to Adamsdown, Newport Road retail parks, Rumney, Llanrumney and St Mellons Business Park
- Cycleway 3: City Centre to Cardiff Bay
- Cycleway 4: City Centre to Llandaff, Danescourt and North West Strategic Development Site
- Cycleway 5: City Centre to Riverside, Ely and Caerau.

== Cycle facilities ==
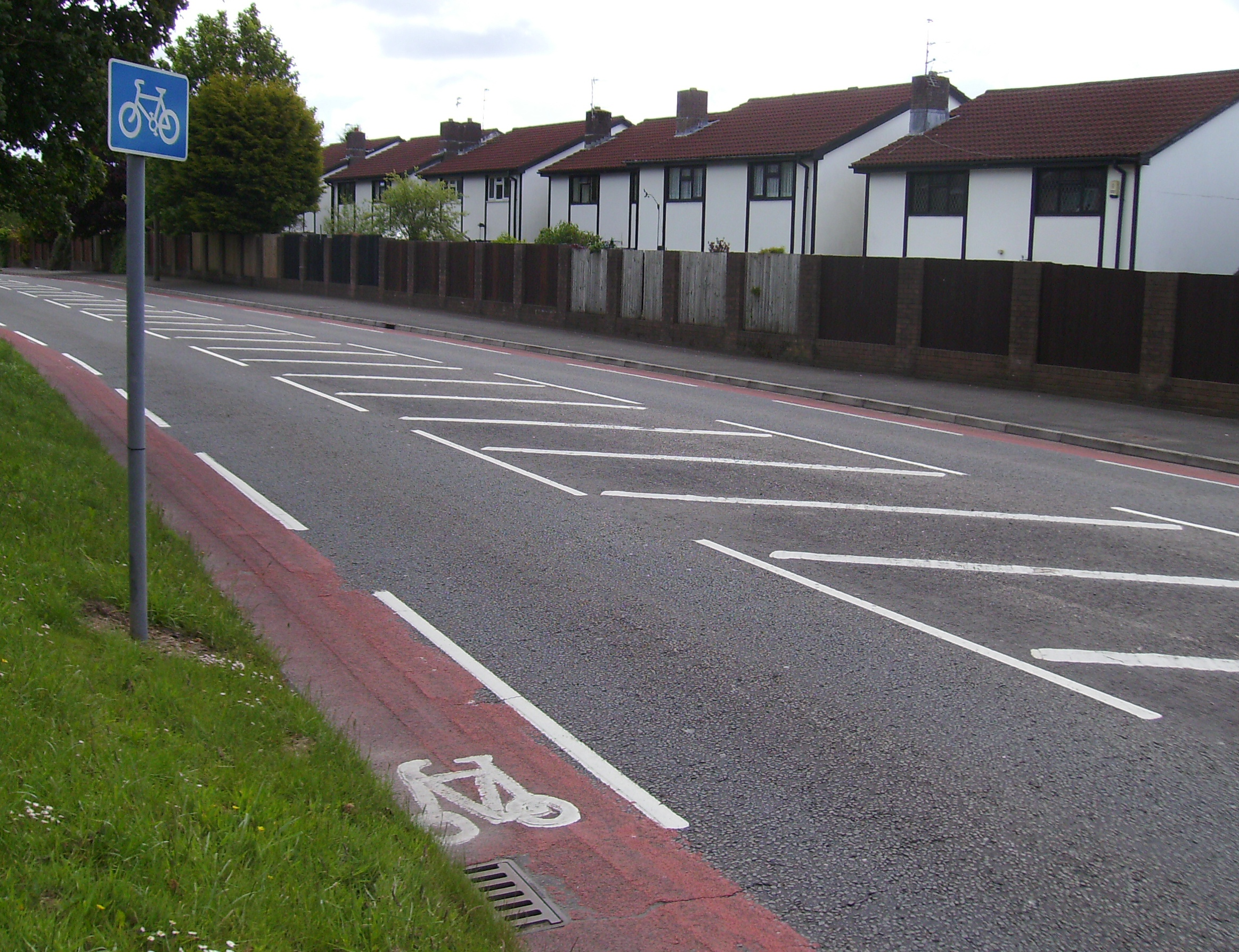
Example from Excalibur Drive of the red cycle lanes used in Cardiff.

=== Cycle Shops ===
The 2011 Cardiff Council cycle map listed 12 cycle shops (down from 14 in 2009) in the city: in Canton, Cathays (Crwys Road), Cathays (Woodville Road), Gabalfa, Grangetown, Llandaff North, Llanrumney, Pontcanna, Rhiwbina, Roath (Broadway), Roath (Newport Road) and Whitchurch. Braddicks on Broadway, Roath, closed in January 2015 after 70 years trading.

=== Cycle lanes ===
Some roads in the city provide distinct cycle lanes to the left of the vehicle lane. According to the Cardiff Cycle Map, these include:

West Cardiff

- Cowbridge Road East and Castle Street: main western approach from Canton to the city centre
- Wellington Street: parallel to Cowbridge Road East and part of the A4161 road
- Pen-Hill Road and Cathedral Road: in Pontcanna
- St Fagans Road and Pencisely Road: roads approaching Waun-Gron Park railway station in Fairwater

North Cardiff

- Caerphilly Road: a main road in Birchgrove from the city centre to northern suburbs and part of the A469 road
- Excalibur Drive: leads from Caerphilly Road to Lisvane and Thornhill railway station in Thornhill
- Ty-Glas Road: leads from Caerphilly Road through Llanishen
- Cathays Terrace: connects Crwys Road (the main road through Cathays) and Corbett Road (around Cardiff University)
- Fairoak Road: connects Crwys Road and Wedal Road (near Roath Park)

South Cardiff

- Penarth Road: part of the A4160 road leads from Callaghan Square near Cardiff Central to Grangetown
- James Street: leads from Grangetown to Cardiff Bay

East Cardiff

- Llanrumney Avenue: a main suburban road running through Llanrumney

=== Bus and cycle lanes ===
There are also lanes that cyclists share with buses, motorcycles and taxis, in which it is illegal to drive on in any other motor vehicle. Such lanes are on:

- Newport Road: in Rumney and Roath, East Cardiff
- Westgate Street, St Mary Street and Wood Street: in the City Centre
- Boulevard de Nantes and Dumfries Place: leading from Cathays Park in the centre to Newport Road and East Cardiff
- Cowbridge Road East: from Canton to Ely Bridge in West Cardiff
- Tudor Street: a main city centre approach from Riverside in West Cardiff

=== Segregated / off-road cycle paths ===
Segregated cycle facilities can be a shared pavement with pedestrians, running alongside a road or through a park for example. This is denoted by a blue circular sign showing a bicycle and pedestrians. A cycle only route is denoted by blue circular sign showing only a bicycle. Much of the Taff Trail, Ely Trail and Rumney Trail are segregated from traffic. Other such routes in the city include:

West Cardiff

- Llandaff Fields: through parkland area in Pontcanna, connecting with the Taff Trail

North Cardiff

- M4 Junction 32: routes run under the junction from Coryton to Tongwynlais
- Gabalfa Interchange: routes run over and round the junction as an alternative to vehicle routes
- University Hospital of Wales: routes run around Heath Hospital through King George Field

South Cardiff

- North Road: from the Royal Welsh College of Music & Drama to Llys Talybont, connecting to the Taff Trail.
- Leckwith Road: from Ninian Park railway station in Canton connecting to the Ely Trail.
- Cardiff International Sports Village: the vicinity has a network of segregated routes connected to the Ely Trail in the west, Grangetown in the north, and Cardiff Bay in the east.
- Lloyd George Avenue: from the City Centre to Cardiff Bay, part of Route 8
- Central Link: parallel to the east of Lloyd George Avenue
- Butetown: a route runs through a housing estate to Cardiff Bay, parallel to the west of Lloyd George Avenue
- Rover Way: through an industrial and commercial estate between Adamsdown and Tremorfa

East Cardiff

- Llanedeyrn: a route runs through the housing estate from St Mellons Road to Llanedeyrn Interchange
- Pentwyn Drive: a route runs along this road in Pentwyn around Wern-goch Park and connects with the Rumney Trail
- St Mellons: routes connect various parts of the suburb
- Llanrumney: a route connects Llanrumney Avenue with Ball Road, near the Rumney Trail

=== Cycle parking ===
There are bicycle stands for parking in locations including the following:

West Cardiff

- Canton: Cowbridge Road East, Wellington Street and Llandaff Road
- Fairwater: Fairwater Library

North Cardiff

- Rhiwbina: Rhiwbina railway station
- Cathays: North Road (A470 road) and Cathays Library
- Penylan: Penylan Library

South Cardiff

- Cardiff Bay: around Mermaid Quay, Wales Millennium Centre, Atlantic Wharf and West Bute Street

Cardiff City Centre

- Central Square: for Central bus and railway stations
- Castle Street: near Millennium Stadium
- Wood Street: at Millennium Plaza
- The Hayes: for Cardiff Central Library
- Westgate Street: opposite Millennium Stadium
- The Friary: for Queen Street
- Park Place: for Queen Street
- Charles Street: for Queen Street
- Churchill Way: for Queen Street and Capitol Shopping Centre
- Queen Street: near junction with Newport Road
- Cardiff Queen Street railway station
- Callahagn Square
- Cathays Park: at City Hall
- Adamsdown: Roath Library

East Cardiff

- Rumney: Rumney Library
- Llanrumney: Llanrumney Library
- St Mellons: St Mellons Library

=== Secure cycle storage ===
In 2025 One Planet Cardiff funded the installation of six secure cycle lockers in front of Cardiff Castle. Further lockers were installed across the city centre in 2026, as part of a 5-year programme. Lockers cost from £1.50 per day, bookable via the Spokesafe app.

In 2026 Cyclehoop installed an initial 17 bicycle 'hangars' in the residential areas of Canton, Riverside, Plasnewydd, Cathays and Splott. Each hangar could hold six bikes and could be hired by residents for £120 per year. The price was criticised for being the most expensive in the UK, with Cardiff cyclists reportedly saying they wouldn't use the hangars.

In April 2026 BikeDok began a 5-year contract with Cardiff Council to install bicycle storage units across the city. 36 would be installed in the city centre and a further 14 in the wider city. Rows of six bike lockers were installed at six locations in the city centre, bookable using the BikeDok app and costing from £1.50 per day.

=== Cycle hire ===
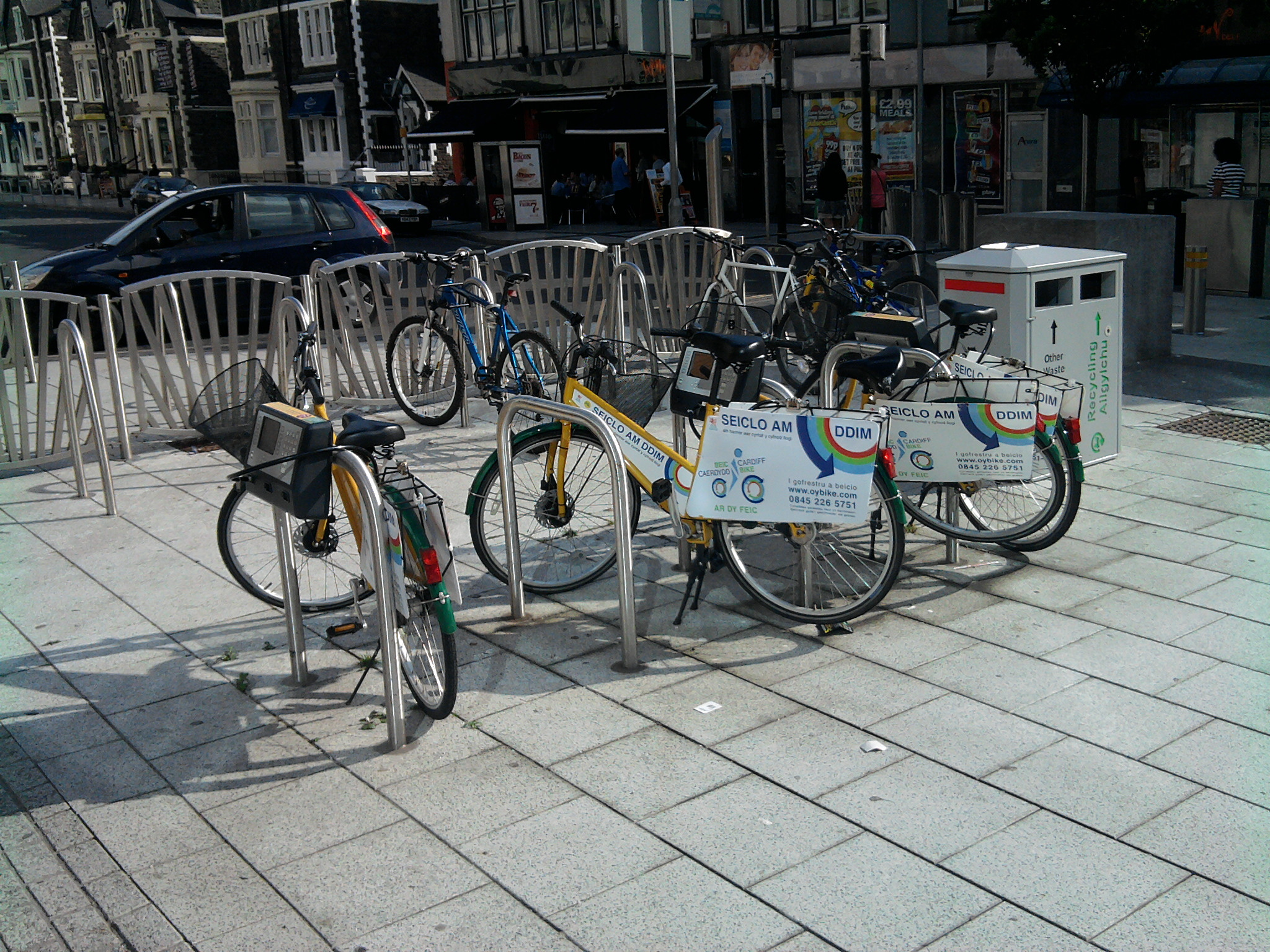
2009 scheme cycle hire station on Queen Street/Churchill Way

Pedal Power is a charity with their main bike centre in Pontcanna offering cycle hire facilities. Cycle training and cycle assessments are also available.

==== OYBike ====
In March 2009 the Welsh Assembly Government and Cardiff Council announced plans to introduce a free cycle hire scheme, with bike racks placed around the city, allowing people to pick up bikes and ride them to another point, where they would leave the bike. Money would also be put into creating more strategic cycle routes and cycle lanes. The system, similar to those in other large cities, launched in September 2009, and included 70 bikes and 35 hire points (initially 7) around the centre and the south of the city. The stations (in 2010) were: Central Station; Cardiff Castle; Central Library; Queen Street Station; Churchill Way; City Hall; eastern Queen Street; Cardiff Bay Station; County Hall; and Cardiff Bay Visitors’ Centre. It was necessary to register before using a bike. The first half an hour was free after which a small hourly fee was payable. The scheme, which was part of a £28.5 million plan to encourage residents in the capital to use sustainable transport and ease congestion, was welcomed by campaigners.

The cycle scheme run by OYBike ended in December 2011 after funding was removed by Cardiff council; the operator did not have other sponsors so the bikes along with their smart locks were removed from the city centre.

==== Nextbike ====
In June 2017 Nextbike was announced as the new provider of a public bike hire scheme for Cardiff. This would integrate new technology into the bikes, rather than the docking stations. Fifty bikes went 'live' in March 2018, with an official launch in May 2018 when the numbers would increase to 250. The bikes could be rented via a website, a telephone hotline, or by downloading a mobile app. Standard charges were £1 for every half hour period. Annual subscriptions were also available. Almost 7,800 people were registered for the scheme by June 2018. Nextbike has been both popular and successful, with Cardiff Council backing the scheme.

Nextbike has begun to introduced electric bikes across Cardiff, where users can rent and return electric bikes.

In 2021 Nextbike secured a sponsorship deal with OVO.

In December 2023, Nextbike announced that they would pull out of Cardiff due to high rates of theft and vandalism.

=== Cycle refurbishment ===
Cardiff Cycle Workshop, a bike workshop launched in July 2010 in Ely, refurbishes and repairs unwanted cycles, saving old bikes from the landfill and revitalises them for new owners at cheaper prices. Cardiff Cycle Workshop has an agreement with Cardiff Council for cages to be placed in the waste facilities in Fairwater and Grangetown for members of the public to leave their unwanted bicycles. Then the bikes are refurbished, checked for safety and have parts replaced. The bikes are then sold for anything from £10 to £150. Three year funding has come from the Big Lottery Fund.

== Cycling routes ==
=== Cross city north cycleway ===
Cross city north cycleway began as a temporary cycleway along Cowbridge Road East, North Road, Boulevard de Nantes, Dumfries Place, and Newport Road. This runs around the city centre, connecting to cycleway 1, cycleway 4, and the Taff Trail. It will eventually also connect to cycleway 2 and cycleway 5.

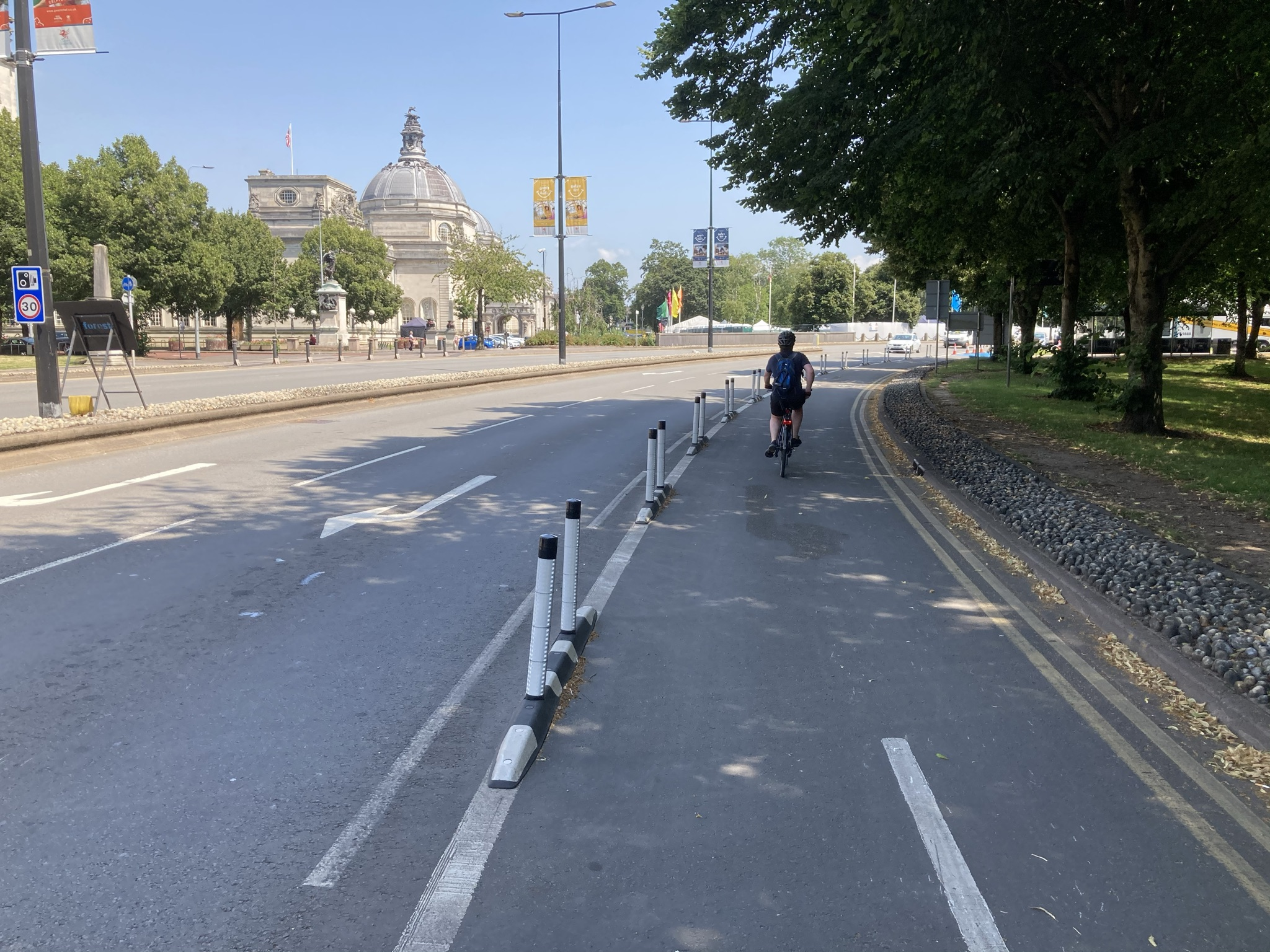
Looking down the route adjacent to Boulevard de Nantes.

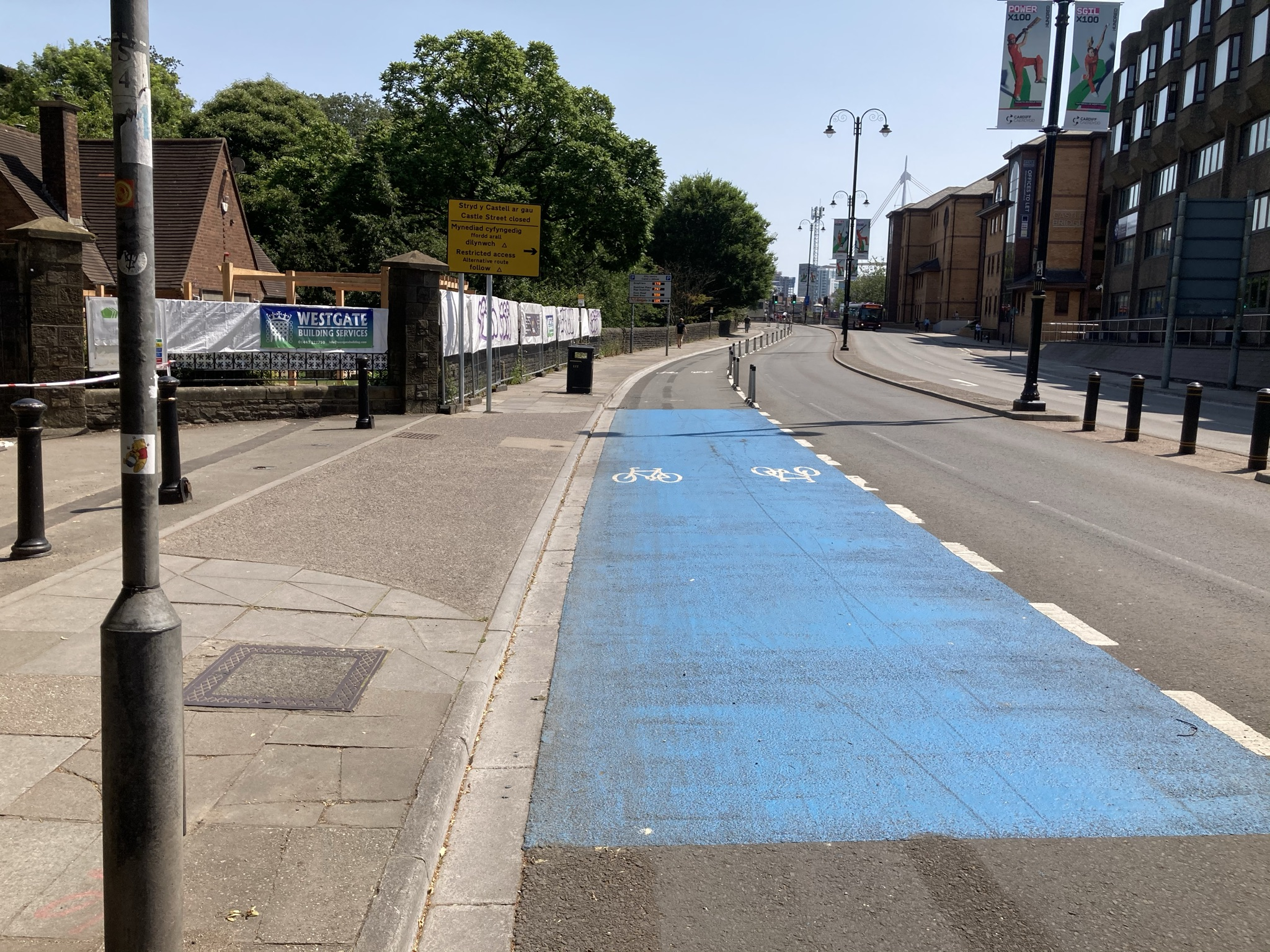
Looking down the route adjacent to Cowbridge Road East, towards the city centre.

=== Cycleway 1 ===
Cycleway 1 is a bidirectional cycle track under development. It will eventually link the city centre to the suburb of Lisvane, with connections to the University Hospital of Wales, Heath High Level railway station, and Heath Low Level railway station. As of 2021, a section on Senghenydd Road had been completed, with construction under way on an extension to the University Hospital of Wales, costing £6,000,000. In 2023, that section was completed.

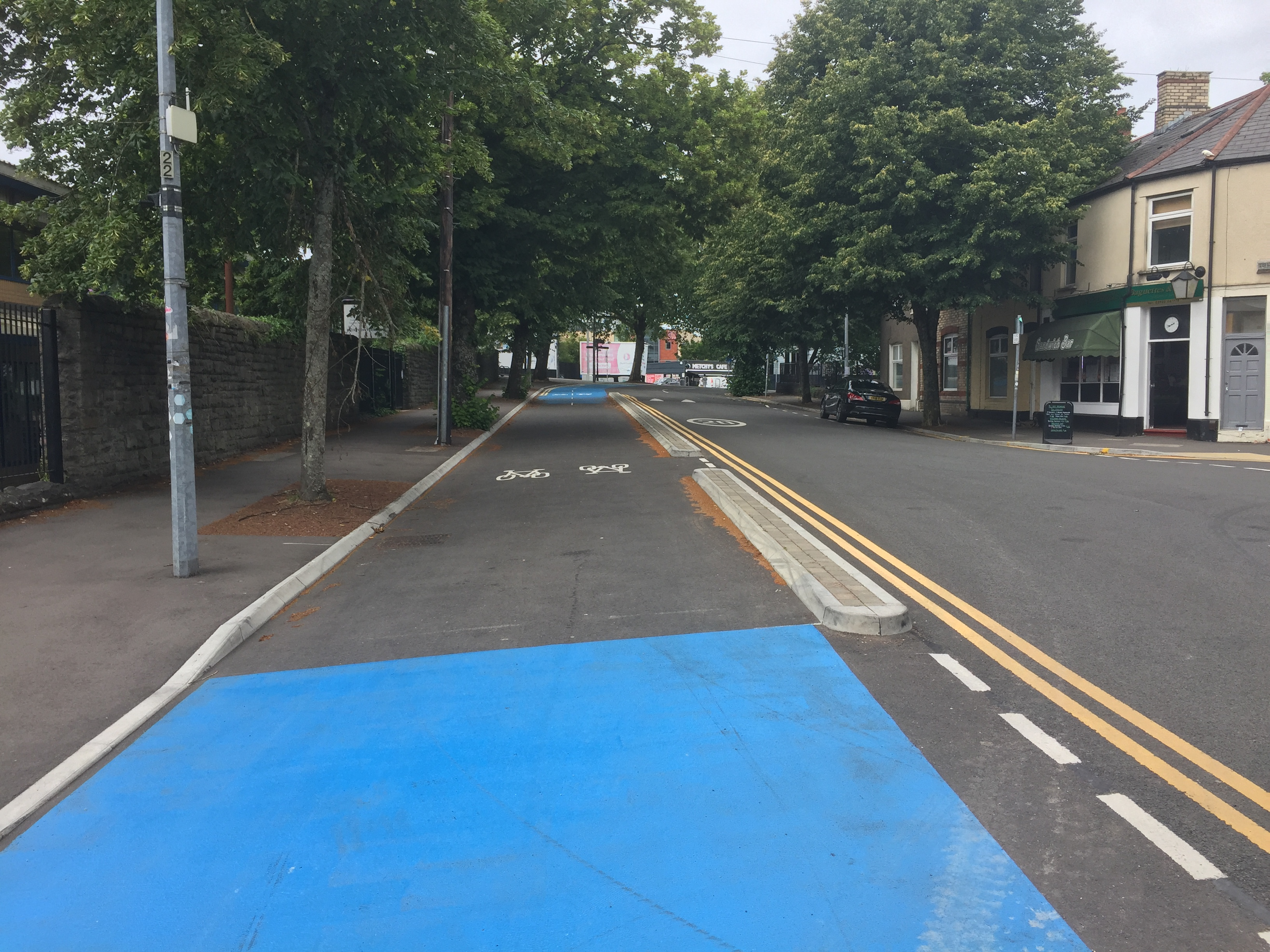
On Senghenydd Road, with blue paint indicating that cyclists have priority over the side junction.

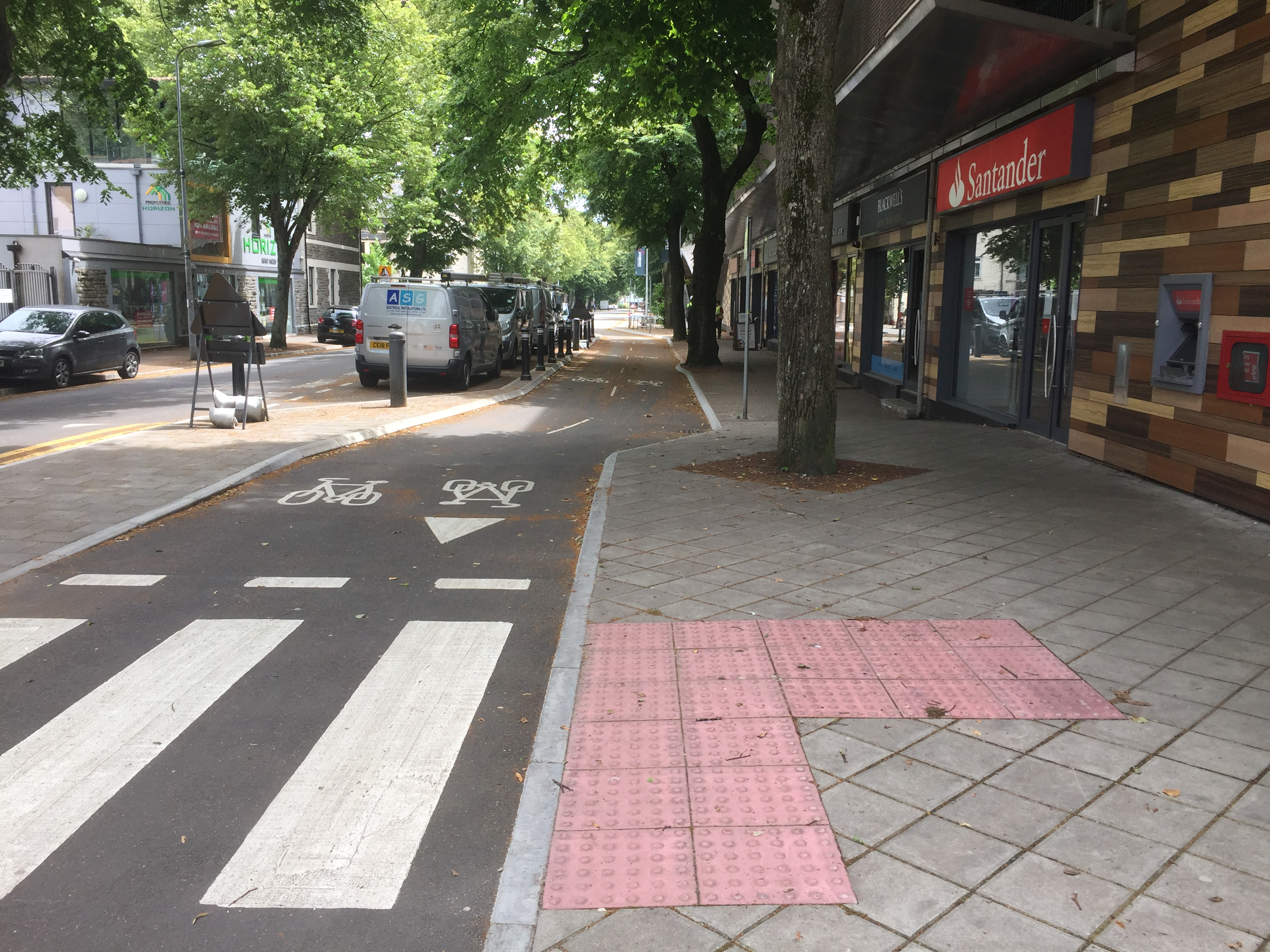
Next to Cardiff University Student Union on Senghenydd Road.

=== Cycleway 4 ===
Cycleway 4 is a bidirectional cycle track. It will eventually link the city centre to Llandaff, Danescourt, and Plasdwr. As of 2021, a section in Sophia Gardens has been completed, with consultations ongoing for an extension to Llandaff.

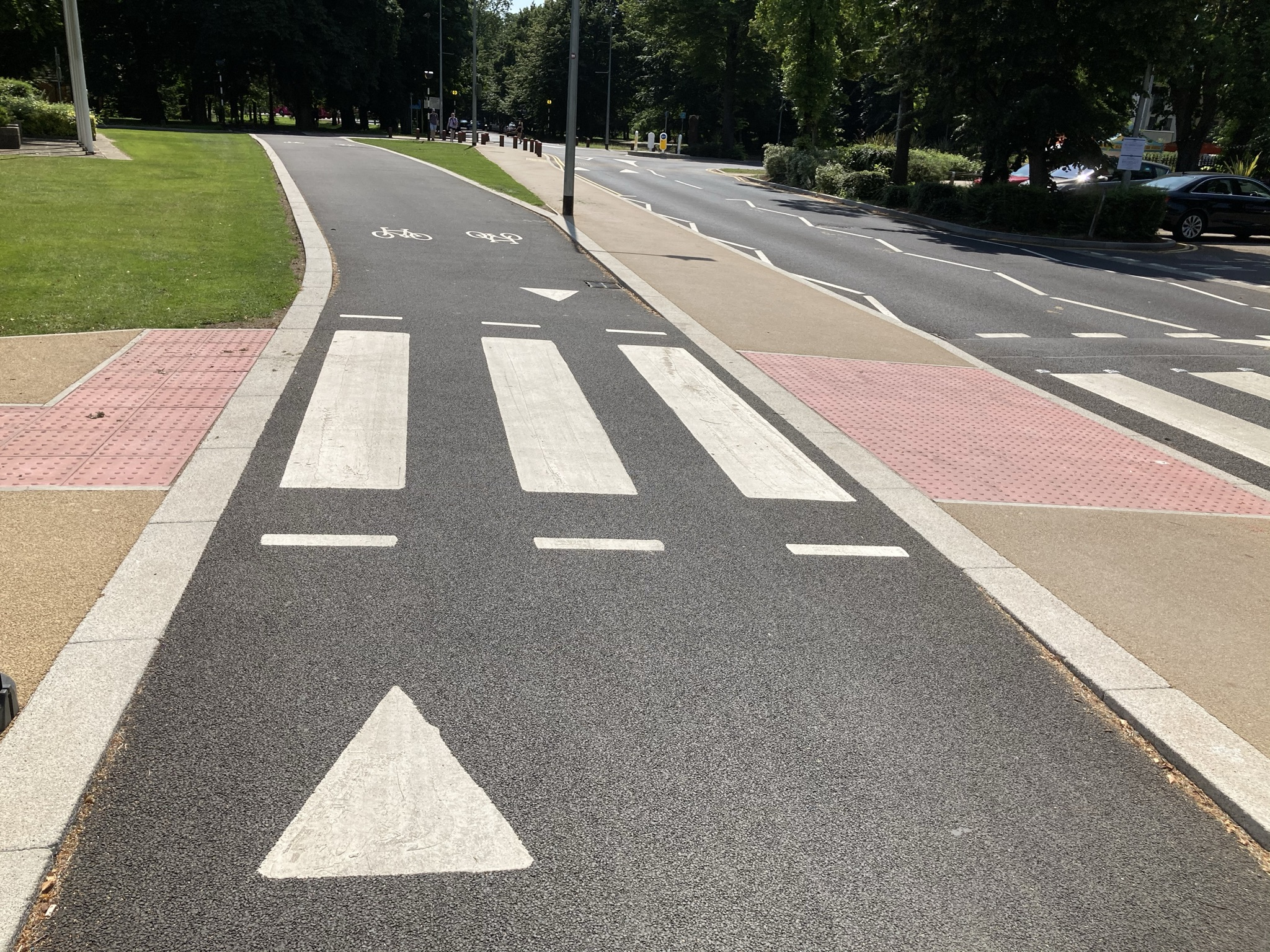
A pedestrian crossing to the SWALEC Stadium in Sophia Gardens.

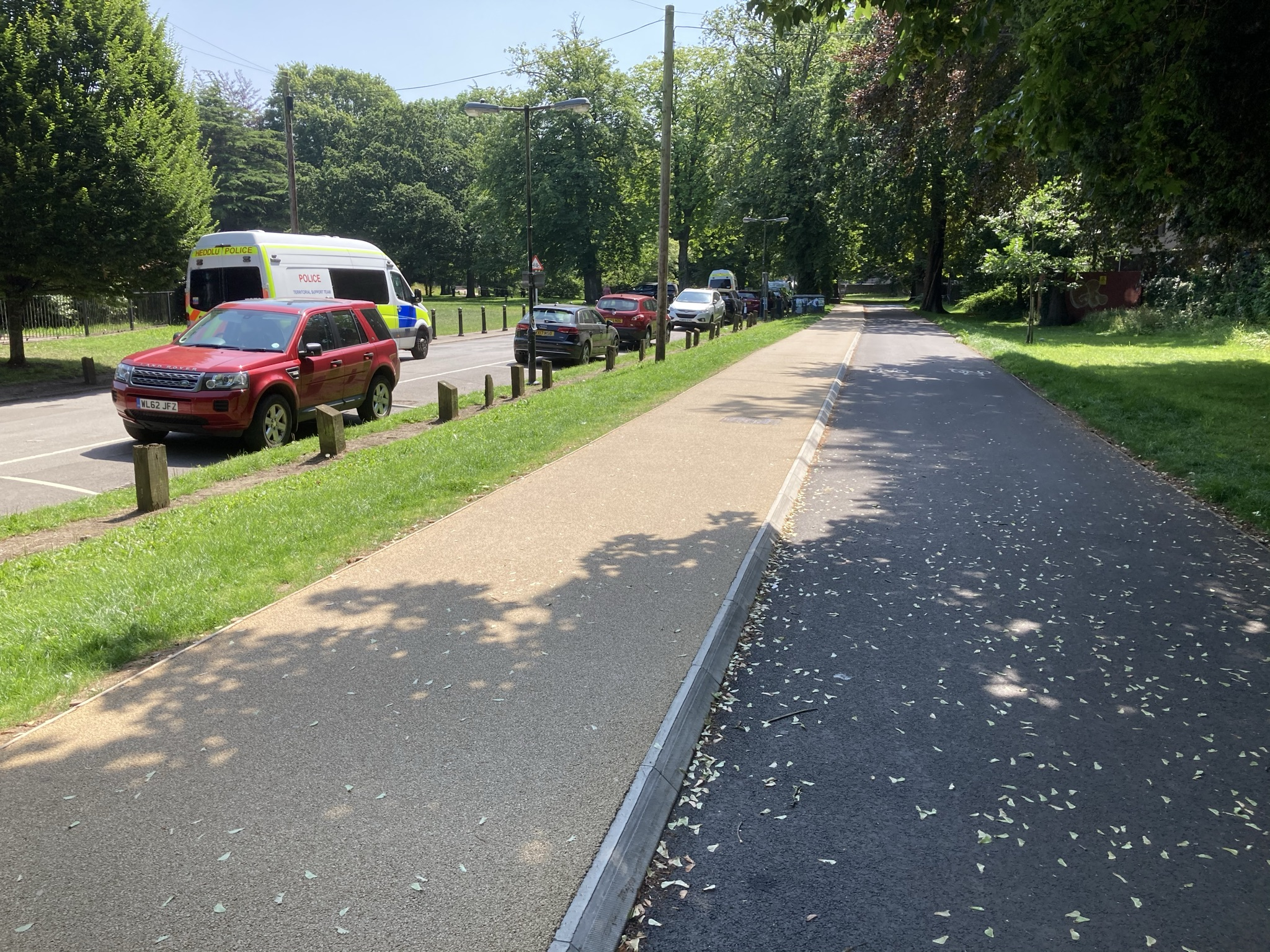
Looking towards the city centre in Sophia Gardens.

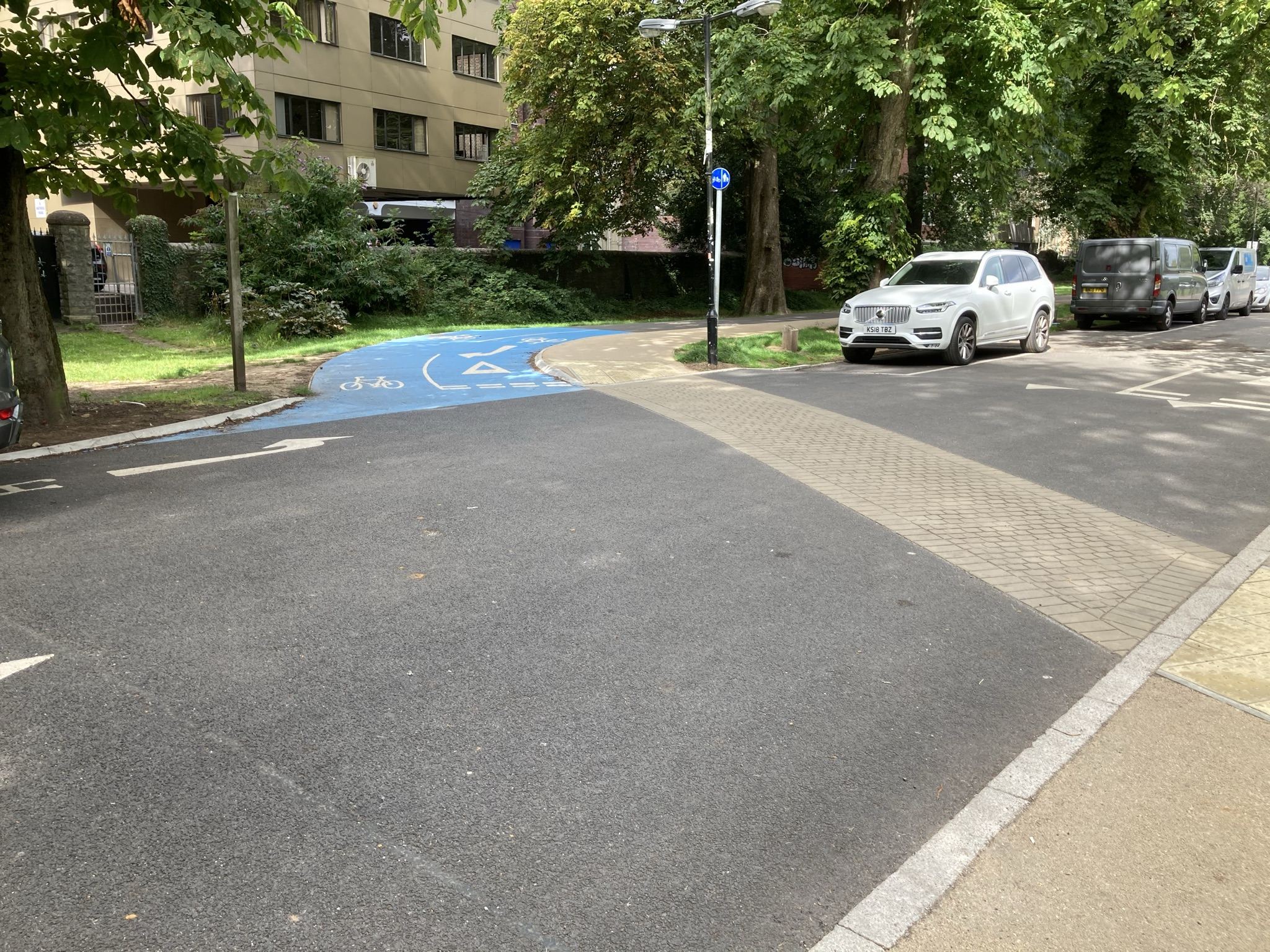
The southern end, where it meets a short path to the Taff Trail and cycleways in the city centre.

=== Ely Trail ===
The off-road Ely Trail is under development in the west and south of the city as of 2010, funded by the County Council, Visit Wales, and Countryside Council for Wales. So far completed is the northern section through St Fagans, Fairwater and Ely, and the southern section running from Leckwith to the south along the River Ely through Grangetown, finishing at the Cardiff International Sports Village. However, these sections are yet to be connected.

The route is connected to Cardiff City Centre via an off-road north-south route through Butetown. The Taff Trail at Cardiff Bay can also be joined from the trail via Grangetown and Butetown.

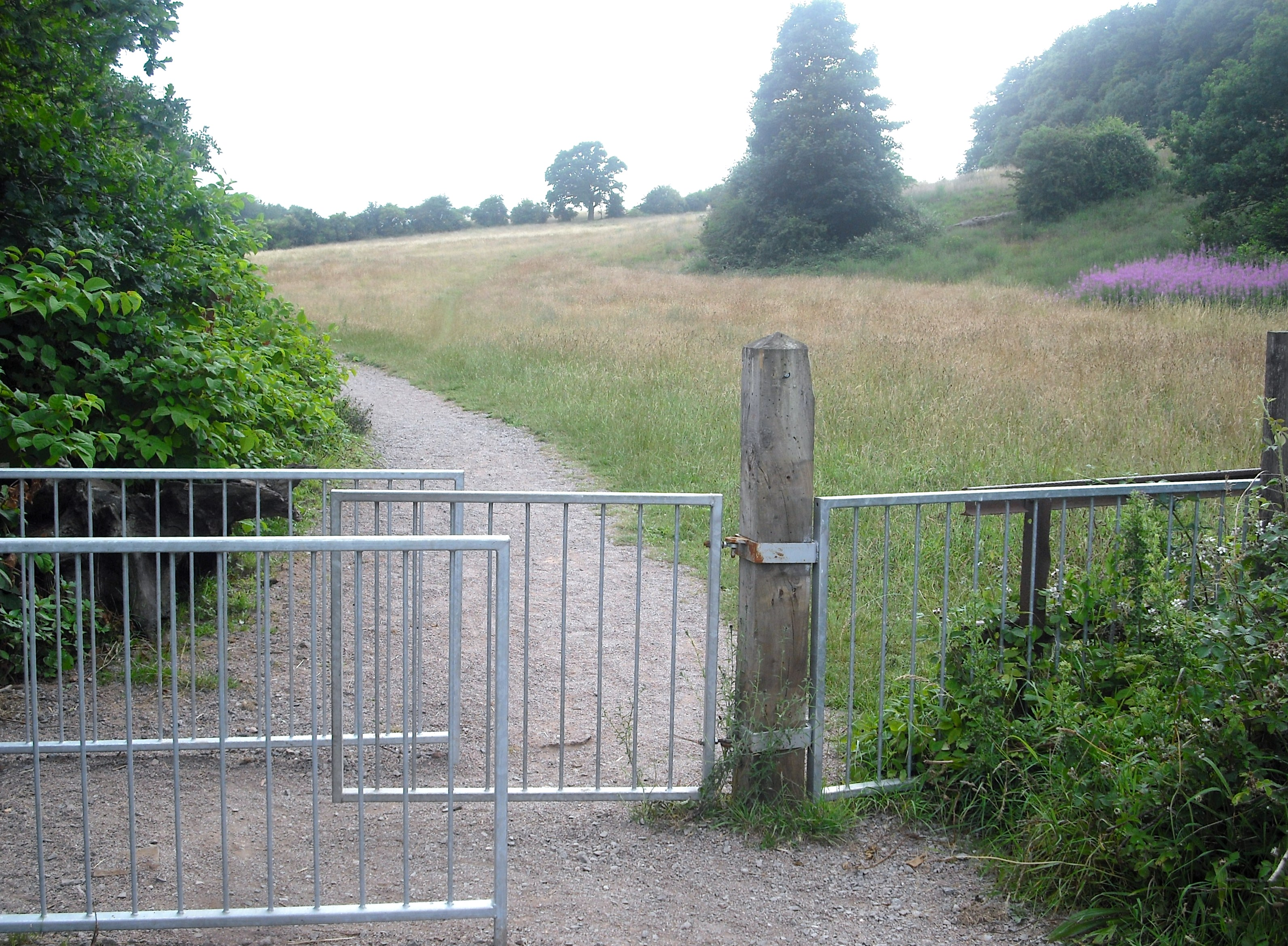
The Ely Trail in Fairwater

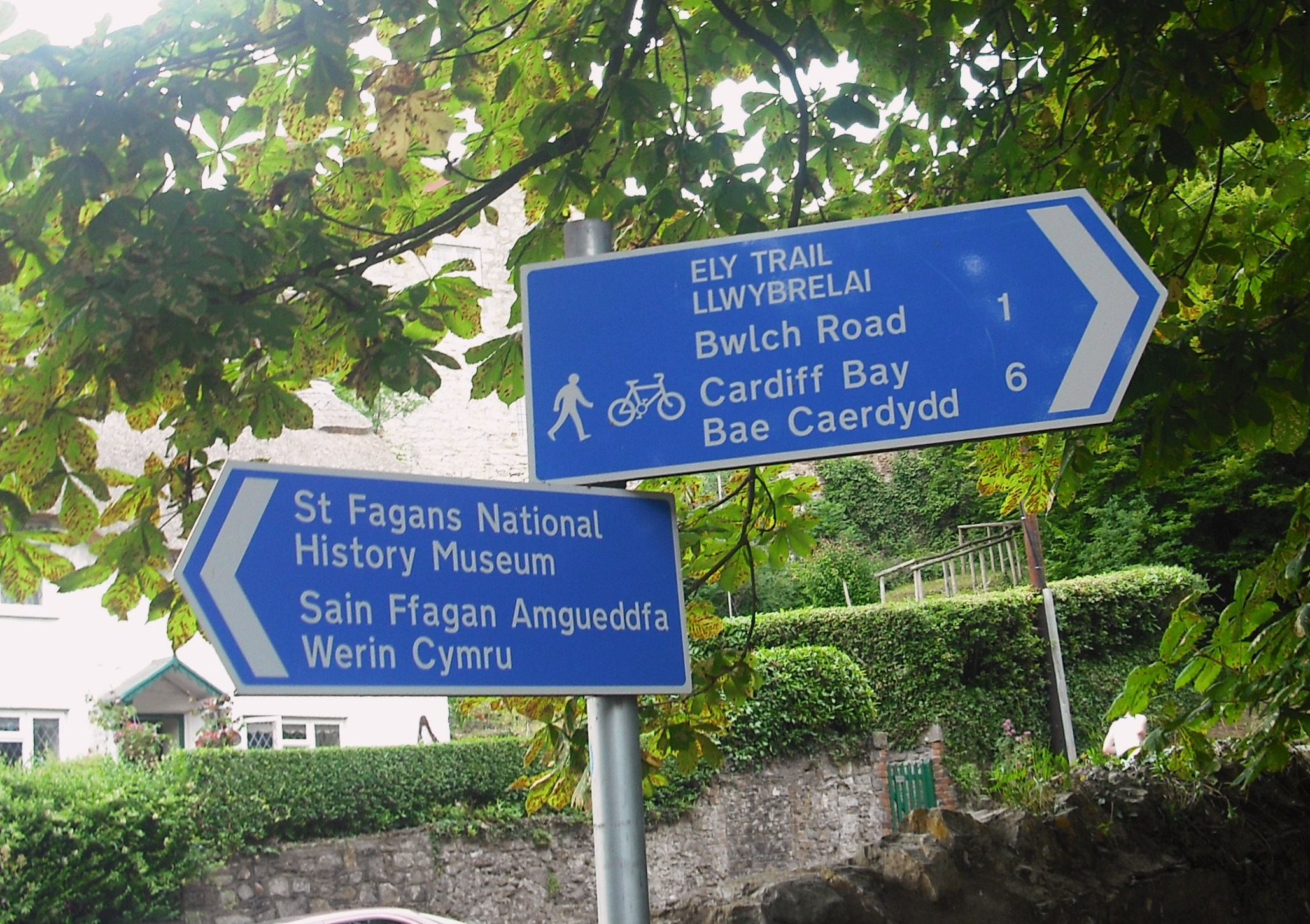
The end of the Ely Trail in St Fagans

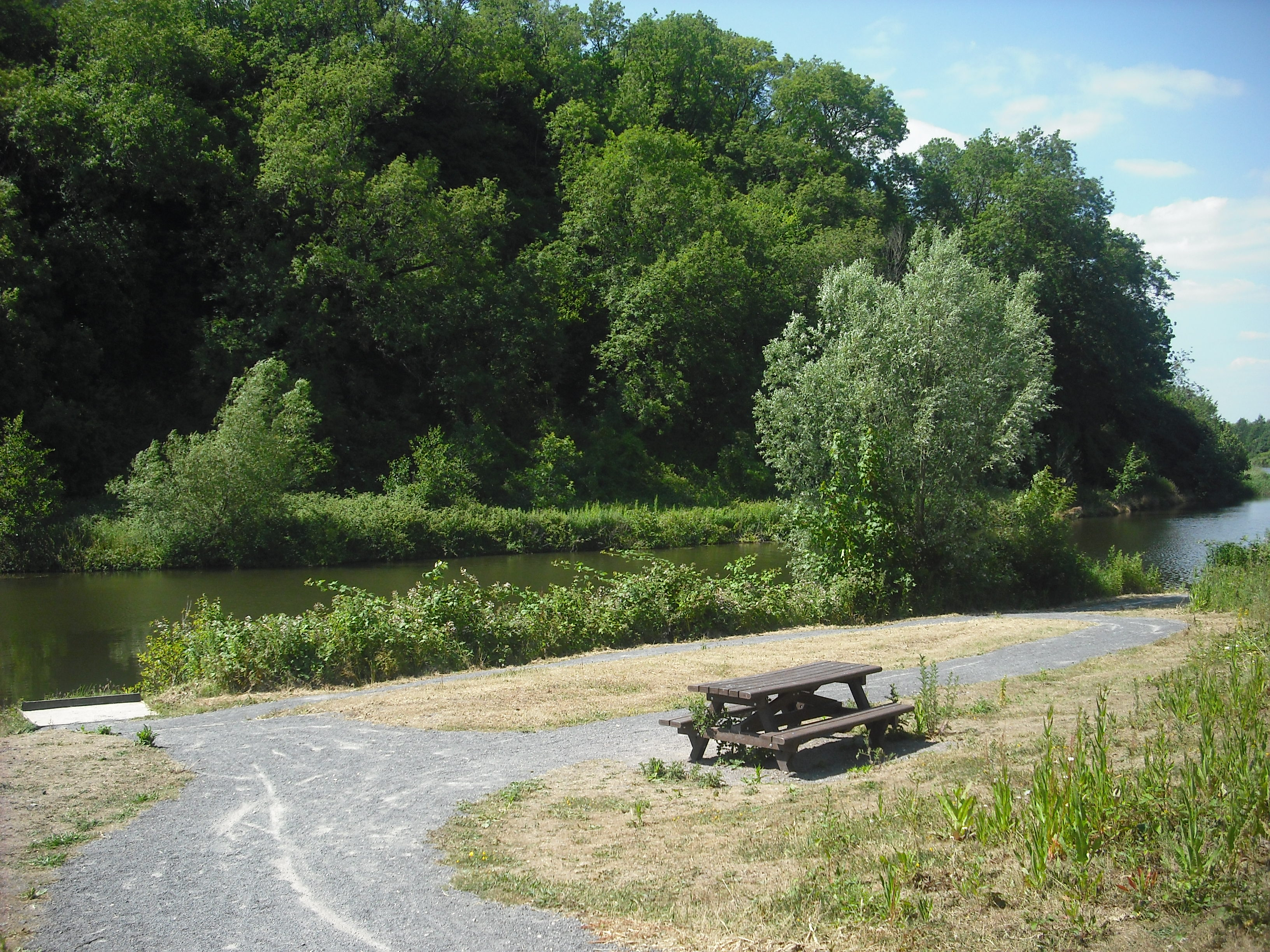
A picnic area on the Ely Trail

=== Llys Tal-Y-Bont Cycleway ===
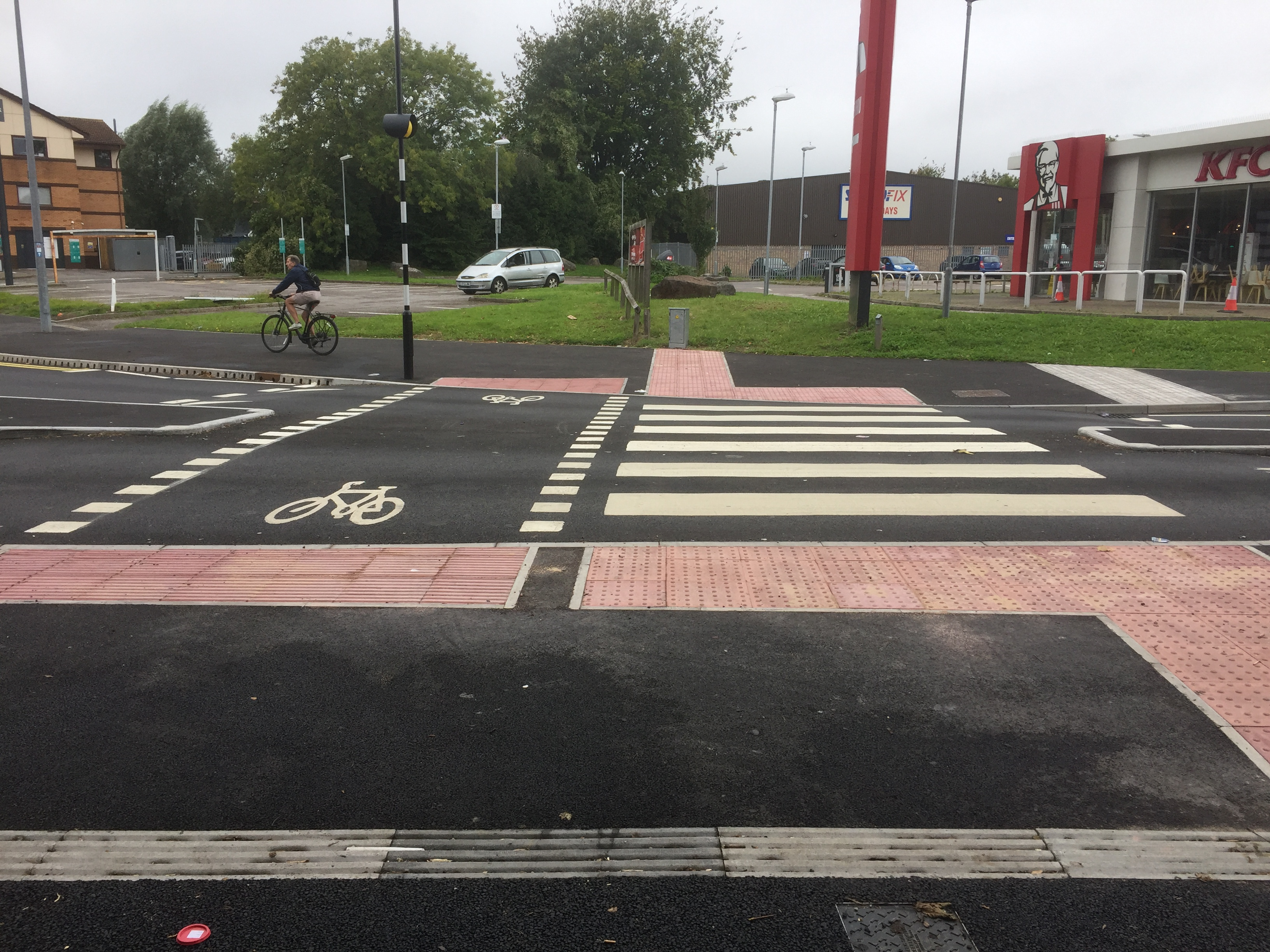
A raised table crossing, part of the Llys Tal-Y-Bont Cycleway.

The Llys Tal-Y-Bont Cycleway is a bidirectional cycle track approximately 0.5km long. It runs from a connection with the Taff Trail and the North Road Cycleway to the Excelsior Industrial Estate, with a connection to a bike park. Originally, this route was a 2m wide shared path, but work in 2020 upgraded it to a 2m wide path for pedestrians and a 4m wide separate path for cyclists. This also makes use of an existing underpass under Eastern Avenue.

=== North Road Cycleway ===
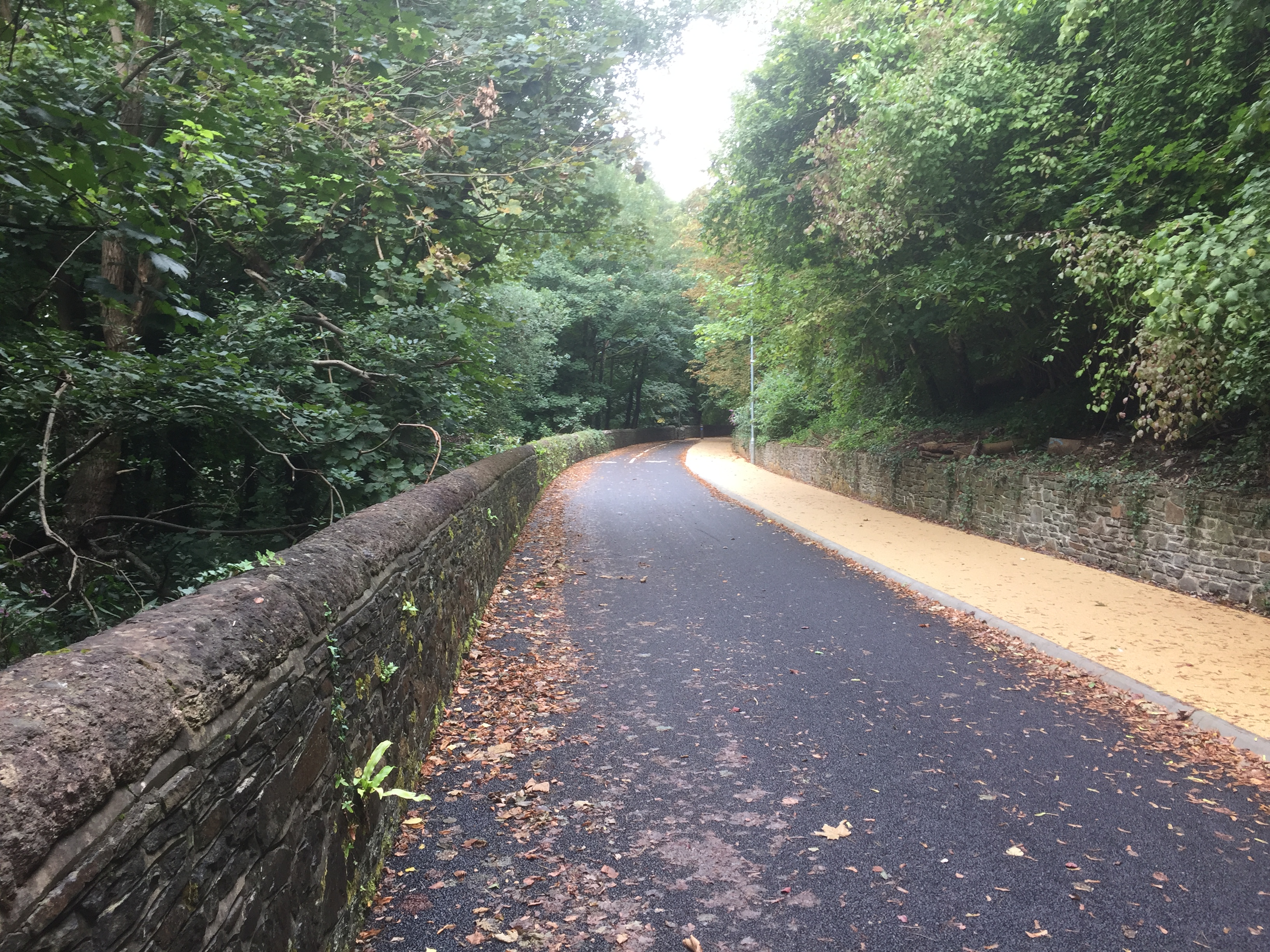
Looking down a section of the North Road Cycleway near Blackweir.

The North Road Cycleway runs from the city centre to Birchgrove. Upgrade work on an existing route began in 2018, and a 2020 upgrade to a large section of the cycleway means that it is both off-road for nearly all of its length and has a maximum width of 4 metres. The cycleway is separated from pedestrians for the newer section near the city centre. The route has been criticised for being too close to trees for much of the route, potentially leading to increased leaf litter.

=== Rhymney Trail ===
The off-road Rhymney Trail is being developed by the Council as a commuting and recreational route along the Rhymney River in the east of the city. Currently completed is the section between Llanedeyrn and Rumney. The Cardiff Cycle Map shows the route running off-road from Llanedeyrn Interchange, bypassing Llanrumney to the west, briefly joining Newport Road (B4487), and then heading south of Rumney to Wentloog Avenue (B4239). However, an off-road section also runs north-south through Pentwyn from Llanedeyrn.

=== Taff Trail ===
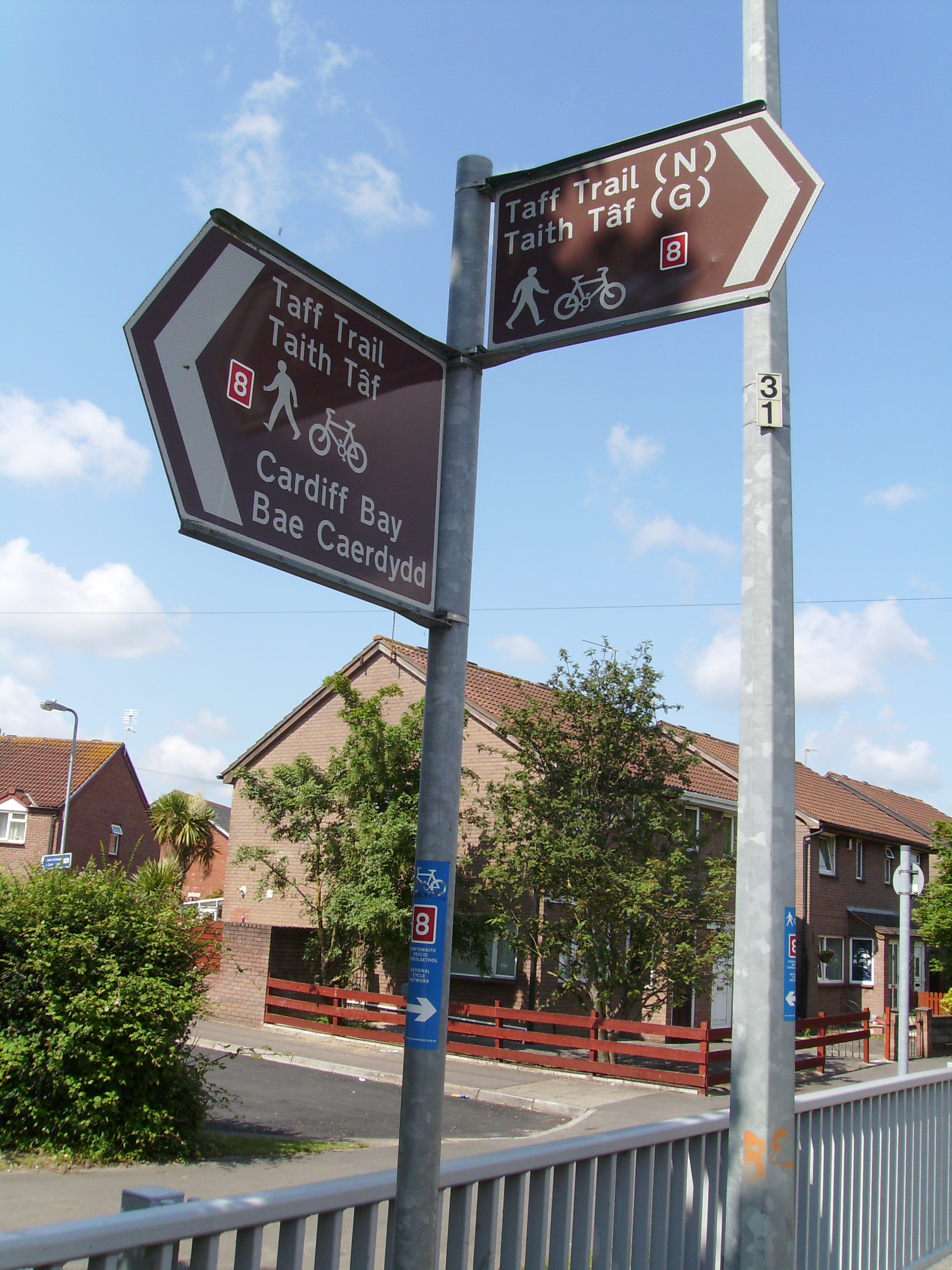
Taff Trail route sign in Grangetown

The 55-mile long Taff Trail runs from Cardiff Bay through Pontypridd and Merthyr Tydfil to Brecon, forming part of the Lôn Las Cymru – the National Cycle Network Route 8 to Holyhead.

The route begins at Roald Dahl Plass in Cardiff Bay and runs mostly off-road through the city for 7.5 miles (12.1 km) north around Grangetown and the City Centre, joining the River Taff in Bute Park before heading north-west through Llandaff and Radyr, leaving the city at Tongwynlais.

=== Route 88: Coastal route ===
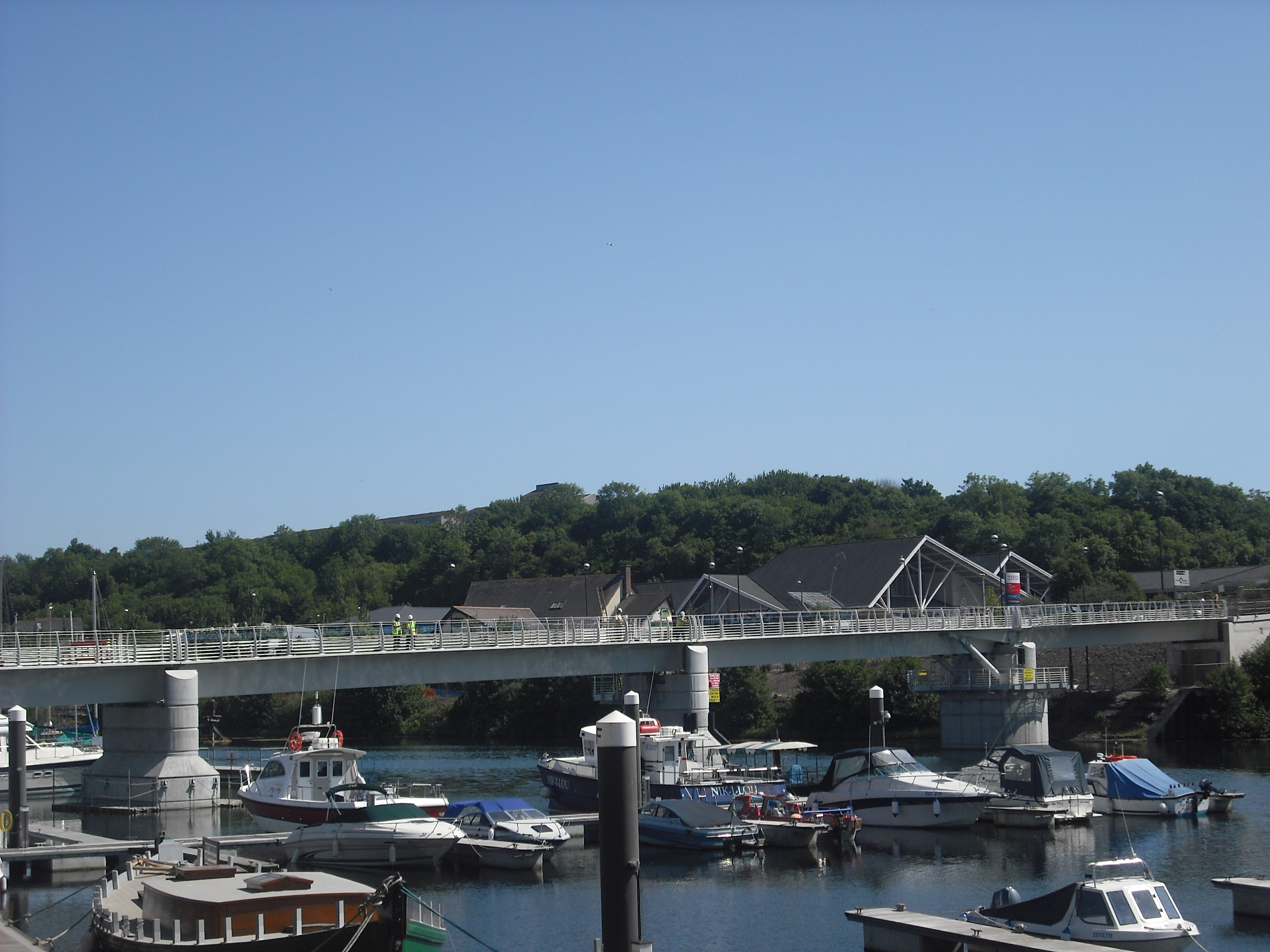
Pont y Werin under construction

National Cycle Route 88 is a coastal cycle route being constructed from Newport to Margam Country Park, Bridgend, via Cardiff.

==== Pont y Werin ====
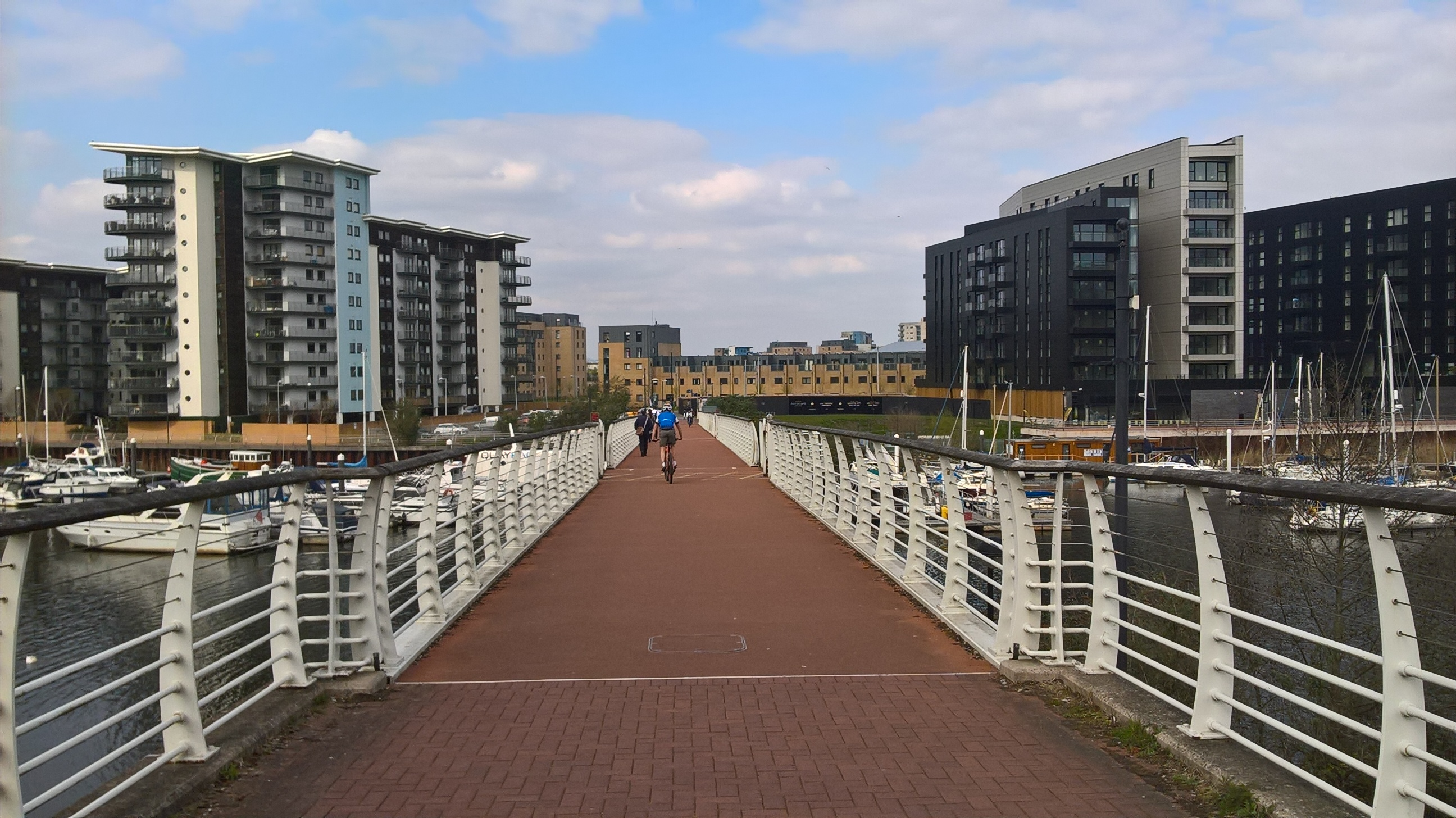
Looking down Pont y Werin from the Penarth side.

Pont y Werin (Welsh for The People's Bridge) is a pedestrian and cyclist bridge spanning the River Ely between Cardiff Bay and Penarth. This forms a key part of Route 88. Costing approximately £4.5 million, Pont y Werin crosses between the Cardiff International Sports Village and Penarth, allowing the public to travel to the Sports Village via Cogan railway station.

Opened on 14 July 2010, the bascule bridge completes the 6.5-mile (10.5 km) Cardiff Bay circular walk and cycle route, and incorporates a 20-metre opening section to allow river traffic to pass. The whole bridge is a shared space for pedestrians and cyclists, and is not wide enough for segregation.

=== Penarth ===
In 2010 it was announced a commuter route for cyclists would be installed, aiming to improve transport links between Penarth and Cardiff Bay.

== Integration ==
=== Cardiff rail network ===
Cycling is integrated into the city's urban rail network, which is operated by Transport for Wales Rail. Most trains have spaces for two cycles. However they are not permitted on services from Caerphilly, Radyr (except the City Line), Cadoxton, and Ebbw Vale Town to Cardiff Queen Street or Cardiff Central between 07:00 and 09:30, or services in the reverse direction 16:00 to 18:00 on weekdays. Outside these times, carriage is still at the discretion of the guard. Folding cycles can be carried folded-up at any time.

There is cycle storage at Cardiff Central station on all platforms, at the front and rear entrances to the station, and in the Riverside car park.

=== National rail network ===
Cycles are also permitted free of charge on the wider national network provided they can be safely stored in the designated areas and reservations through the train operator are recommended. Bikes must be carried in the designated area of the train and can't be stored in aisles or vestibule areas. Cycles can not be carried on rail-replacement coach services. Folding bikes can be carried at all times as normal hand luggage.

Transport for Wales also operates most of the Welsh rail network and its cycle policies apply to other services as well without the restrictions applied to the Cardiff rail network.

=== Buses ===
Cycles can not be carried on bus services in Cardiff. However, a Beacons Bus runs on Sundays and Bank Holidays in summer to Brecon which tows a cycle trailer to carry cycles. Efforts have been made to ensure there is bike parking next to bus stops.

== Cycling Campaigns in Cardiff ==
=== Walk Wheel Cycle Trust ===
The Walk Wheel Cycle Trust, previously known as Sustrans, is a UK sustainable transport charity that constructs safe cycle routes and other inititiatives to encourage people to walk or cycle. Their Valleys Cycle Network project aims to add 100 miles of vehicle-free routes in the Valleys of South Wales.

In September 2011 it was announced that Sustrans Cymru were launching a new project in Cardiff funded by the Wales Government. This involved offering expert consultation to Cardiff householders to draw up personal travel plans, designed to reduce car journeys and encourage, amongst other things, increased use of bicycles.

=== Cardiff Cycling Campaign ===
The Cardiff Cycling Campaign campaigns for better provisions for cyclists in the city, believing that the council's attitude is inadequate. While it welcomes the Council's commitment to consider the needs of cyclists, it argues that these should not be marginal in relation to the management of cars and buses. A sea-change in thinking is required and available Council funds need to be used imaginatively to create 'coherent and continuous routes' through the city for cyclists. For example, safe cycling routes through the city centre were lost with the construction of the new St Davids 2 shopping centre.

In April 2006 the Campaign pointed out that only 2.7% of people cycled to work in Cardiff. Campaigners cycled through Cardiff city centre during a rush hour period, accompanied by local councillors and a Welsh Assembly Member. A participating councillor was quoted as saying 'I was happy to rise to the challenge but at times it was frightening. The cycle lanes were sometimes inadequate and complicated, and if I hadn't been with the campaign I probably would have got lost'.

=== Cycle Cardiff ===
Cycle Cardiff aims to raise awareness of cycling and organises bike rides in and around the city.

=== World Naked Bike Ride ===
The Cardiff World Naked Bike Ride has taken place annually since 2008. This is part of a globally coordinated World Naked Bike Ride, designed to highlight the vulnerability of cyclists on the road and campaign for better cycling facilities. In June 2011 80 cyclists reportedly took part riding through the centre of Cardiff, many of them naked.

== See also ==
- Outline of cycling
- Cycleways - Cardiff.gov.uk
