= Drope =

Coordinates: 51.474722°N 3.286389°W

Drope: Welsh: Y Ddorop
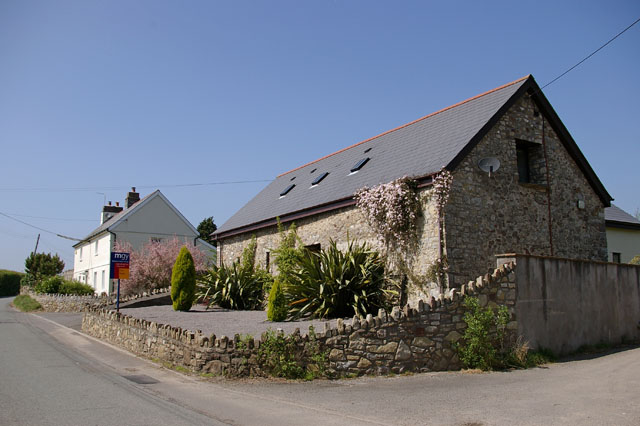

- Location within the Vale of Glamorgan
- OS grid reference: ST108758
- Community: St Georges-super-Ely
- Principal area: Vale of Glamorgan
- Preserved county: South Glamorgan
- Country: Wales
- Sovereign state: United Kingdom
- Postcode district: CF
- Police: South Wales
- Fire: South Wales
- Ambulance: Welsh
- UK Parliament: Vale of Glamorgan
- Senedd Cymru – Welsh Parliament: Vale of Glamorgan

Drope (Welsh: Y Ddorop) is a hamlet in the valley of the River Ely in Vale of Glamorgan, southeast Wales, just beyond the territorial border of western Cardiff. It lies immediately east from Michaelston-super-Ely, west of Ely, Cardiff and southeast of St Georges-super Ely and is accessed via a bridge along Drope Road across the A4232 road to the north of Culverhouse Cross. Drope was designated a special conservation area in March 1973 by the former Glamorgan County Council due to its architectural heritage.

== Landmarks ==
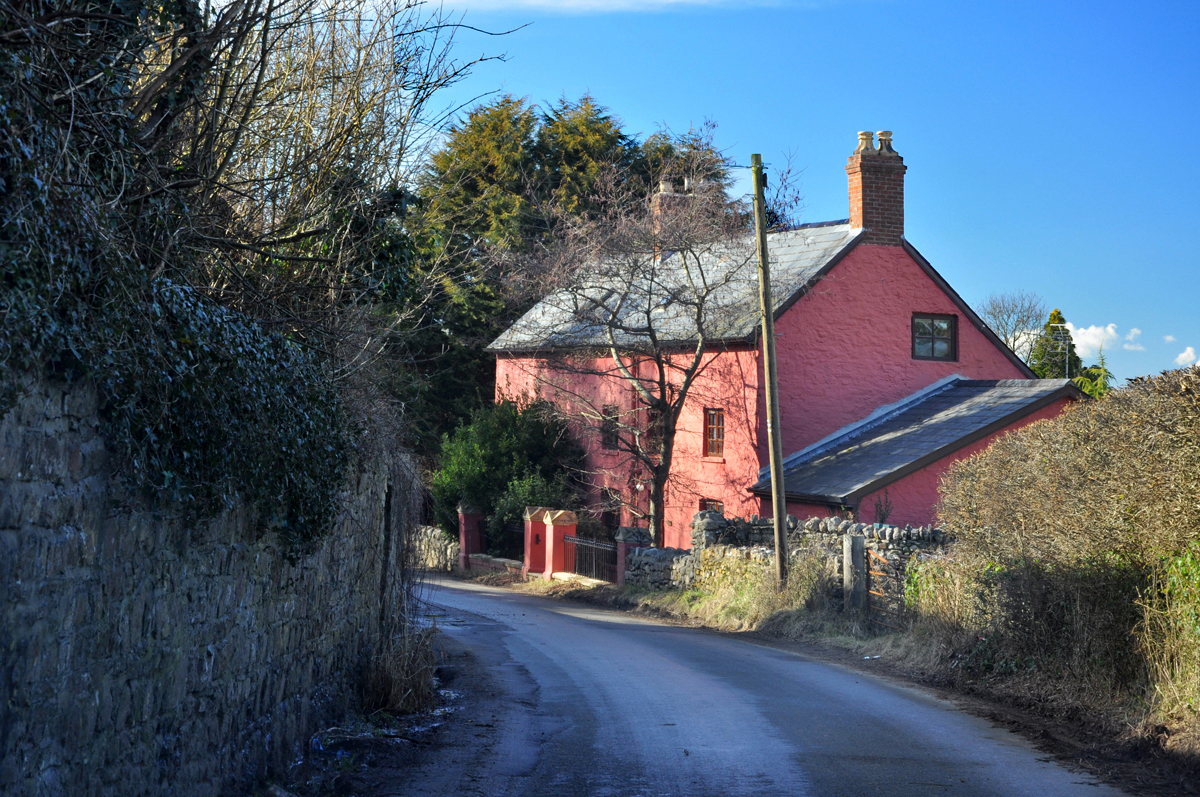
Ty Llwyd Farm and lane, Drope

The farms of Drope, Ty Llwyd and Ty Uchaf and The Old Rectory in Drope have been identified as buildings which make a positive contribution to the special architectural or historic interest of the conservation area. The Old Rectory dates to the early Victorian period and set in landscaped gardens, it features a slate roof under local limestone walls. To the south is Coedarhydyglyn.
