= Robert Robotham (priest) =

English anglican priest

Robert Robotham, D.D. was an Anglican priest in the late 16th and early 17th centuries.

Robotham was born in Buckinghamshire was educated at Magdalen College, Oxford. He held livings at Newland, Gloucestershire, St Georges super Ely, Caerwent, Mitcheltroy, Llangibby, Dilwyn and Aymestrey. He became Archdeacon of Llandaff in 1617. from 1601 to 1607.
