= St Fagans =

Village and community in Cardiff, Wales

St Fagans: Welsh: Sain Ffagan
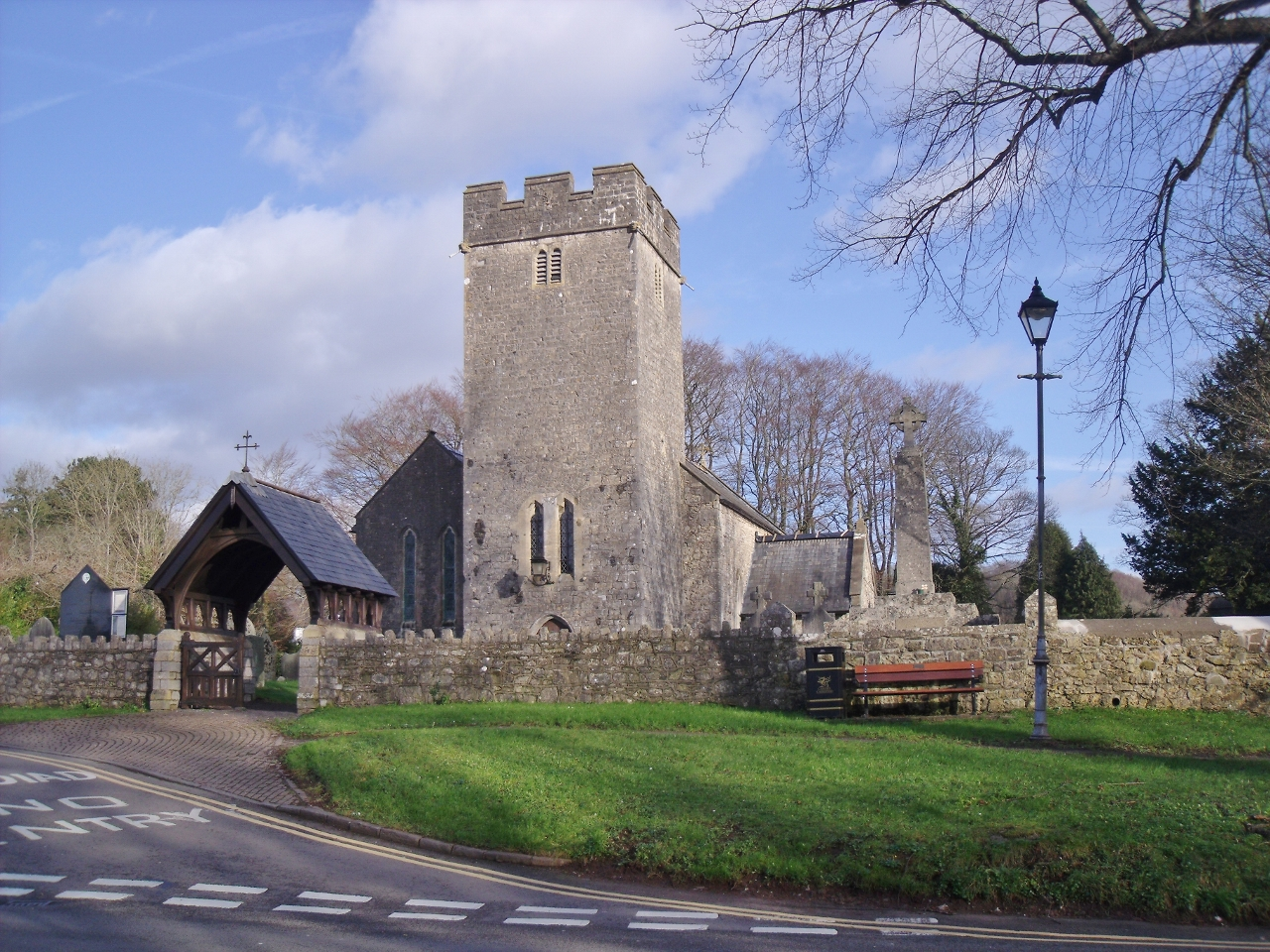
- St Mary’s Church, St Fagans

- Location within Cardiff
- Principal area: Cardiff
- Preserved county: South Glamorgan
- Country: Wales
- Sovereign state: United Kingdom
- Post town: CARDIFF
- Postcode district: CF5
- Dialling code: 029
- Police: South Wales
- Fire: South Wales
- Ambulance: Welsh
- UK Parliament: Cardiff West
- Senedd Cymru – Welsh Parliament: Cardiff West
- List of places UK Wales Cardiff 51.487°N 3.268°W Map of the community

St Fagans (/ˈfæɡənz/ FAG-ənz; Welsh: Sain Ffagan) is a village and community in the west of the city of Cardiff, capital of Wales. It is home to the St Fagans National History Museum.

== History ==
The name of the area invokes Saint Fagan, according to William of Malmesbury a second-century missionary to Wales but for whom there is no reliable historical evidence.

In 1648, the Battle of St Fagans took place close by.

== Description ==
To the south lies the village of Michaelston-super-Ely, and to the east the suburb of Fairwater. The community includes Rhydlafar to the north. St Fagans lies on the River Ely, and previously had a railway station on the South Wales Main Line, and currently there is a level crossing.

Creigiau	Pentyrch	Radyr
St Georges super Ely	St Fagans	Fairwater
	Michaelston super Ely	Ely

The village is home to St Fagans National Museum of History (formerly called the Welsh Folk Museum and the Museum of Welsh Life) which includes St Fagans Castle and gardens. St Mary's Church in the village dates from the 12th century, with an 18th-century tower. St Fagans Old Rectory is another important Grade II* listed building nearby.

St Fagans is home to St Fagans Cricket Club.

In 2017 construction started on a new Cardiff suburb of 7,000 houses, named Plasdwr, on countryside between St Fagans, Fairwater and Radyr.

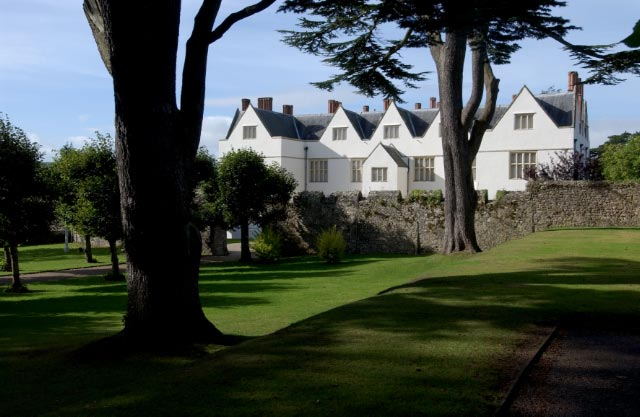
St Fagans Castle

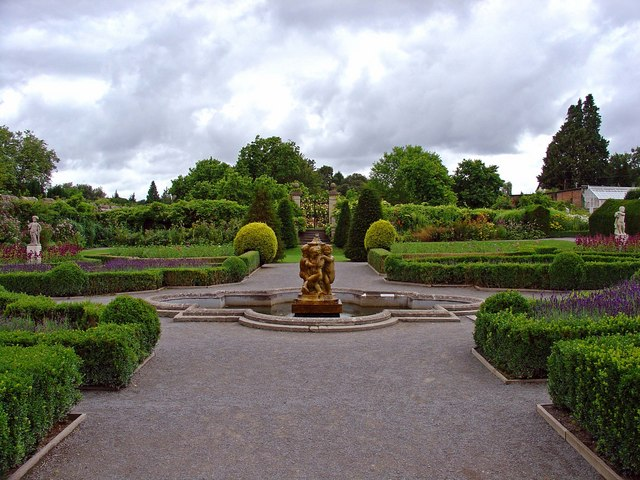
The formal gardens of St Fagans Castle

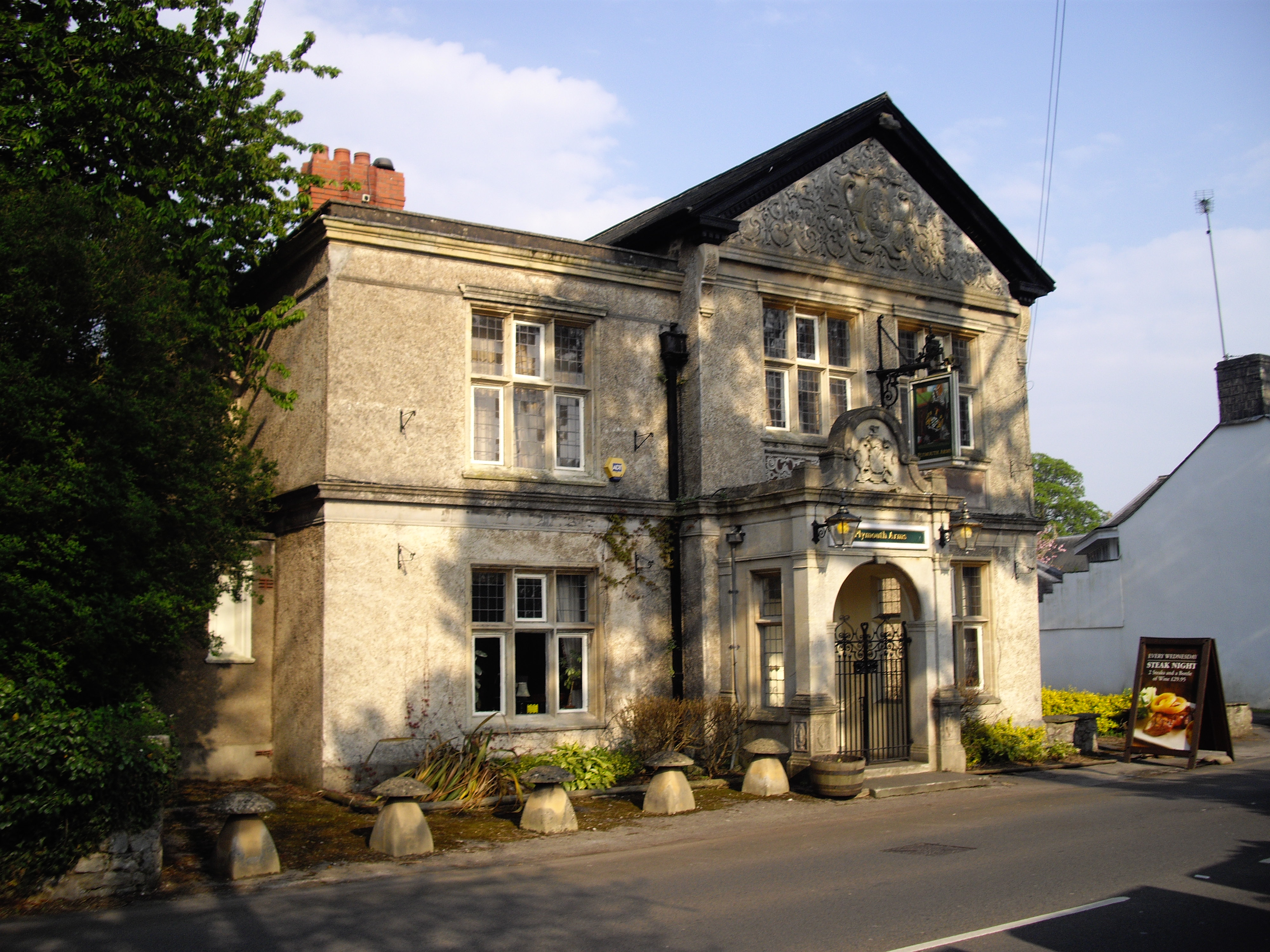
The Plymouth Arms public house

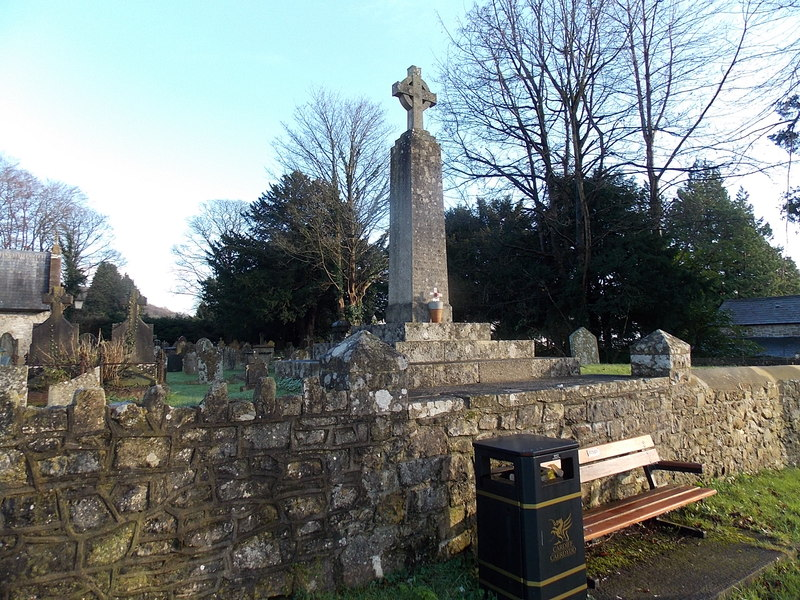
War memorial

== Local government ==
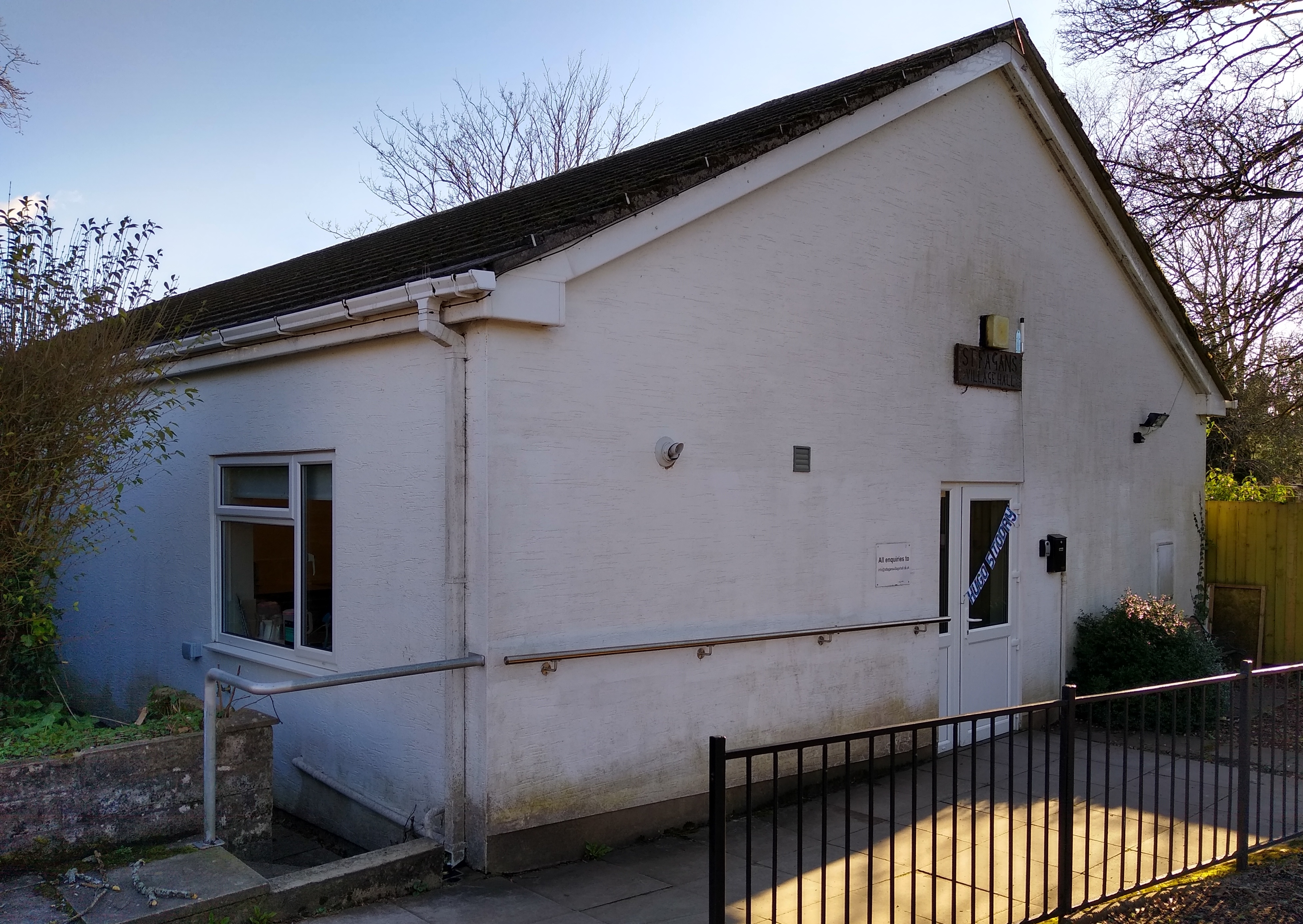
St Fagans Village Hall

St Fagans elects a community council of up to nine community councillors. The council is funded by a precept on local council tax bills and supports a number of local facilities and services. Elections are held every five years.

=== 2017 Community Council Election ===
Six candidates stood for nine seats during the 2017 Cardiff Council election. All candidates were therefore elected unopposed, with three other seats filled through councillors being co-opted by members of the community council.

=== 2022 Community Council Election ===
The next election is due to be held in May 2022.
