= St Brides-super-Ely =

Village in the Vale of Glamorgan, Wales

Coordinates: 51.491260°N 3.302142°W

St Brides-super-Ely: Welsh: Llansanffraid-ar-Elái
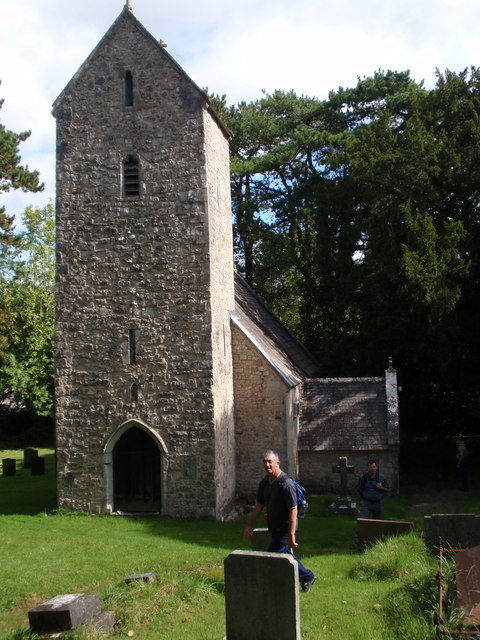

- Location within the Vale of Glamorgan
- OS grid reference: ST 0969 7773
- Community: St Georges-super-Ely
- Principal area: Vale of Glamorgan
- Country: Wales
- Sovereign state: United Kingdom
- Post town: Cowbridge
- Postcode district: CF5
- Dialling code: 01446
- Police: South Wales
- Fire: South Wales
- Ambulance: Welsh
- UK Parliament: Vale of Glamorgan

St Brides-super-Ely (Welsh: Llansanffraid-ar-Elái) is a village and district of the community of St Georges-super-Ely, within the Vale of Glamorgan in South Wales. It is located near the western border of the Welsh capital city of Cardiff, to the west of the A4232, and north of the River Ely.

The medieval Church of St Ffraid at St Brides is Grade II listed. An ancient yew tree stands in the churchyard near the south porch. It is 24 ft in diameter at its lower crown.

The Grade II listed house St-y-Nyll stands just outside the village. It was designed by Percy Thomas and was built in 1924.
