= St-y-Nyll =

Grade II listed house near St. Brides-super-Ely, Vale of Glamorgan, Wales

Coordinates: 51.4941°N 3.3017°W

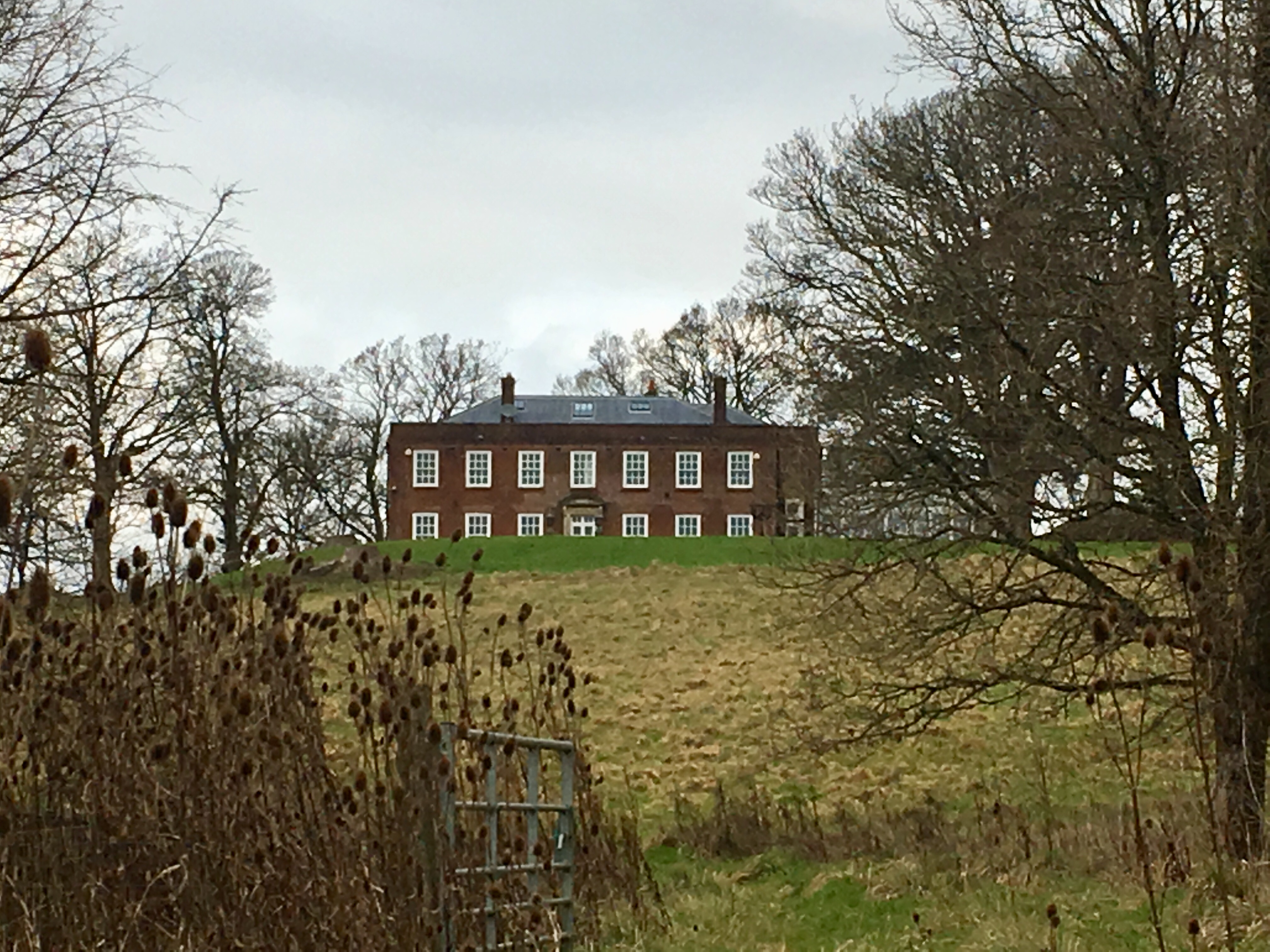
St-y-Nyll in January 2021

St-y-Nyll is a large detached house near the village of St. Brides-super-Ely in the Vale of Glamorgan.

It was built in 1924 by the Welsh architect Percy Thomas in the Neo-Georgian style. A Tudor mansion dating from the 1480s had stood on the site. It has been listed Grade II by Cadw since June 1977. It was listed for sale in 2000 for £715,000 and was described as having 13.4 acres (5.4 ha) of grounds. The interior is noted for its plaster cornices, parquet floors, and original fireplaces dating from the 17th century, the Georgian period, and in the style of Robert Adam. It sold for £1.5 million in June 2020.
