= Castle Farmhouse, St Georges-super-Ely =

Medieval farmhouse in Wales

Castle Farmhouse
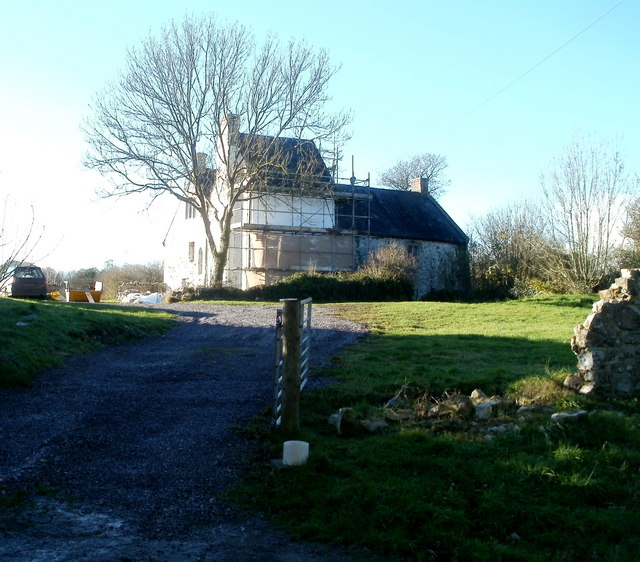
- "important medieval fabric and magnificent timber roof"

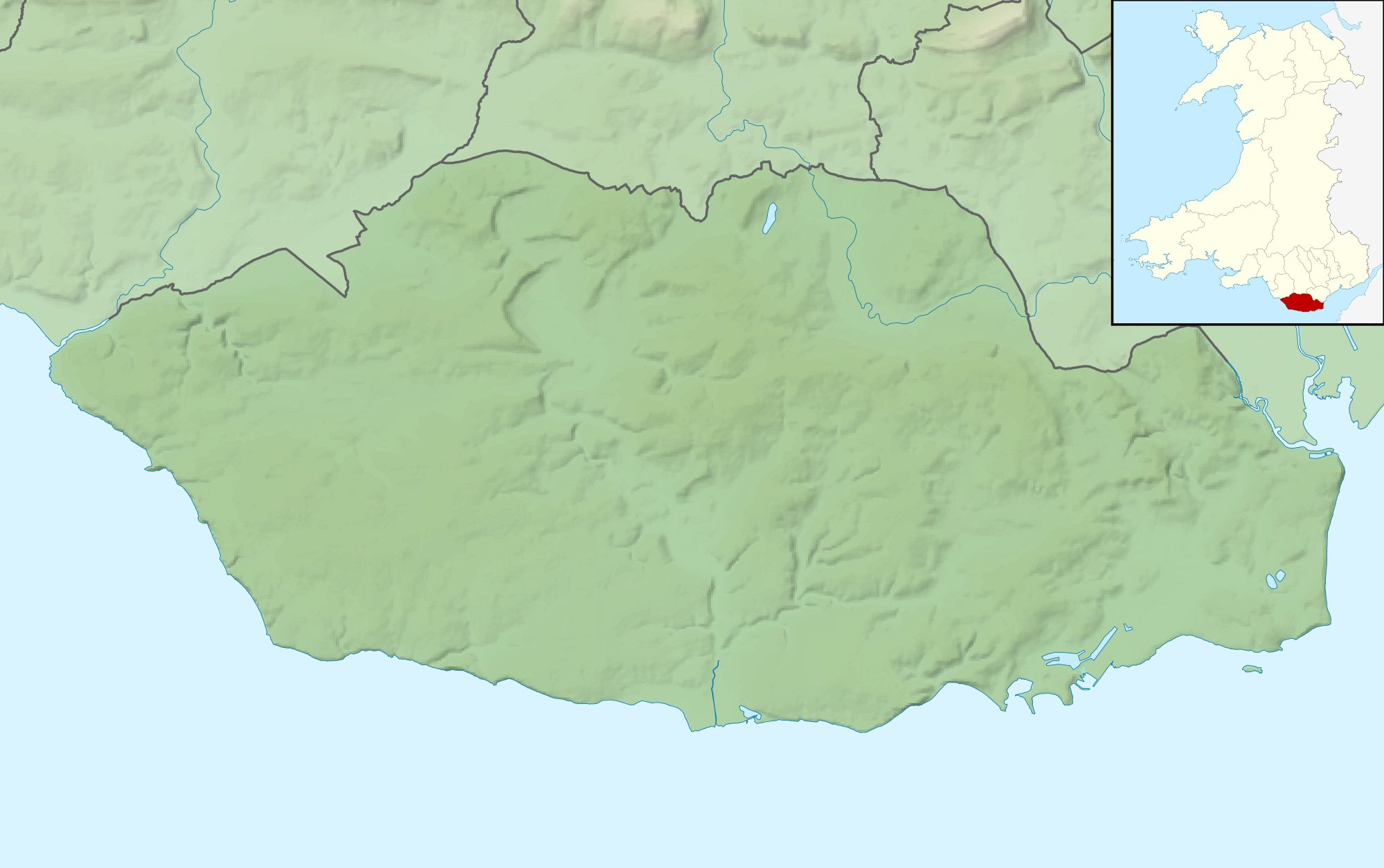
- Location within Vale of Glamorgan
- 51.4828°N 3.2994°W
- Type: House
- Location: St Georges super Ely

History
- Built: Medieval

Site notes
- Area: Vale of Glamorgan
- Governing body: Privately owned

Listed Building – Grade I
- Official name: Castle Farmhouse
- Designated: 14 February 1952
- Reference no.: 13600

Castle Farmhouse is a medieval farmhouse in St Georges super Ely, in the Vale of Glamorgan, south Wales. Its origins are as part of the Norman castle of the Le Flemings, after which it declined in status, first to a manor house, and subsequently to a farmstead. It was designated a Grade I listed building on 14 February 1952.

== History and description ==
Cadw records the building's origins as part of the castle of the Le Flemings, who acquired the manor of St George's in 1314. The architectural historian John Newman notes the "great thickness" of the north and west walls, indicating their initial use as part of a fortified structure. Newman also records the 15th century great hall as "the glory of Castle Farm", The hall was originally subdivided. The farmhouse was listed Grade I in 1952.

The farmhouse was the subject of an episode of the television programme The Restoration Man (Season 2, episode 6).
