= Roath Library =

Public library in Cardiff, Wales

Coordinates: 51.4870°N 3.1599°W

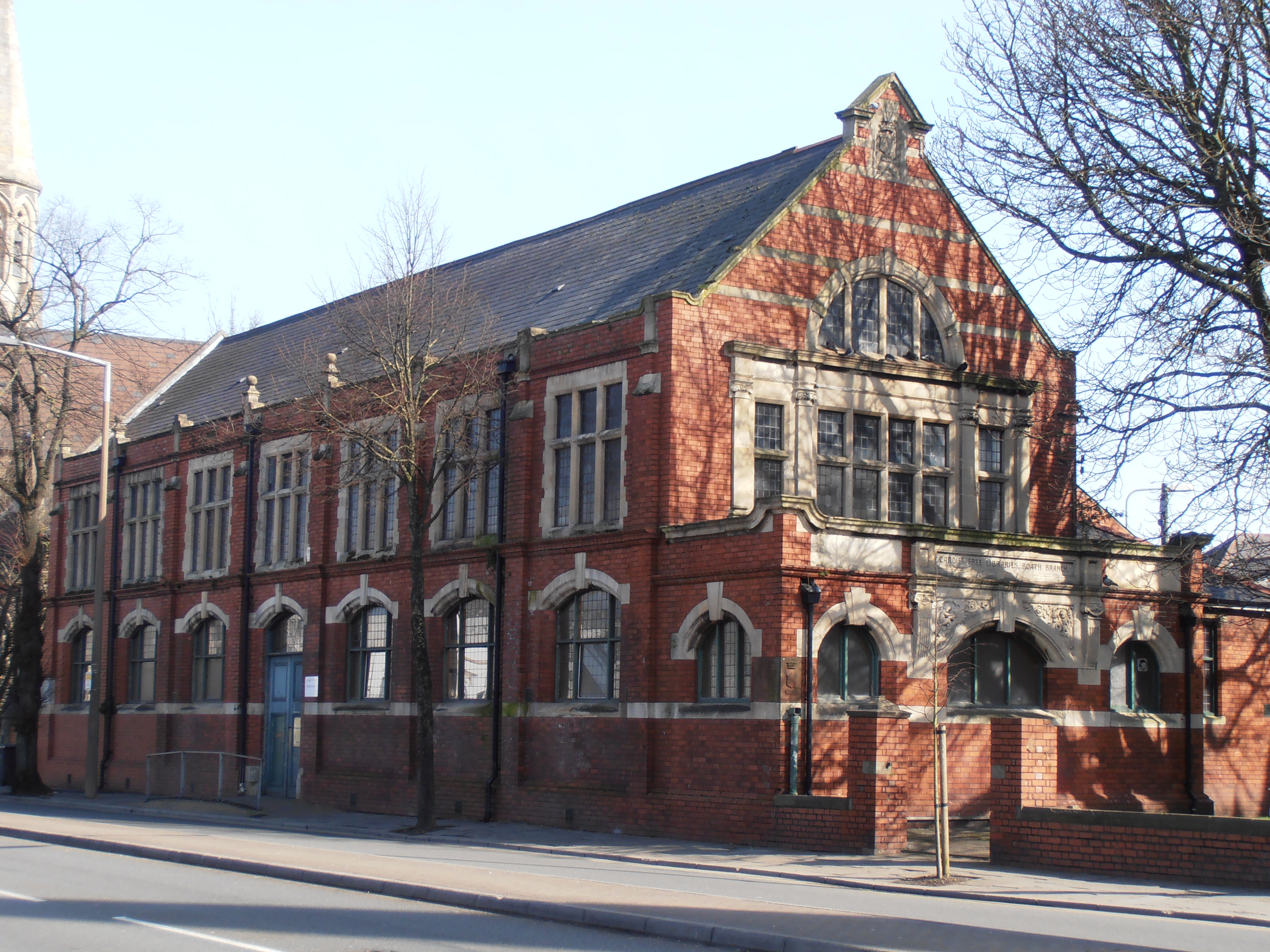
Roath Library

Roath Library is a Grade II listed building on Newport Road, Cardiff, on the border of the Roath and Adamsdown districts. In 2014 the library closed for repairs, and in 2015 it was decided to close the library permanently.

The Roath Branch Library was designed by architects Teather & Wilson and built between 1900 and 1901 on a triangular site bounded by Newport Road, Four Elms Road and Clifton Street. The red brick building with bathstone dressing was extended eastwards in 1936. It was completely refurbished in 1992/3.

In 1997 the library building became Grade II listed, as a good example of its type. It forms a valuable group with nearby church buildings.

In the early 2010s the library was threatened with closure. It shut in November 2014 with the Cardiff Council claiming they were to carry out repairs. Despite a council meeting in February 2015 reversing some funding cuts to the library budget, in May 2015 it was announced the repair bill was too high and the library would close permanently. The books and computers were removed later in the year, though the council said they would keep ownership of the building if a community group was able to take over responsibility for running it. In the meantime, a mobile library van was to provide a service to the area.
