= Bidirectional traffic =

Two streams of traffic that flow in opposite directions

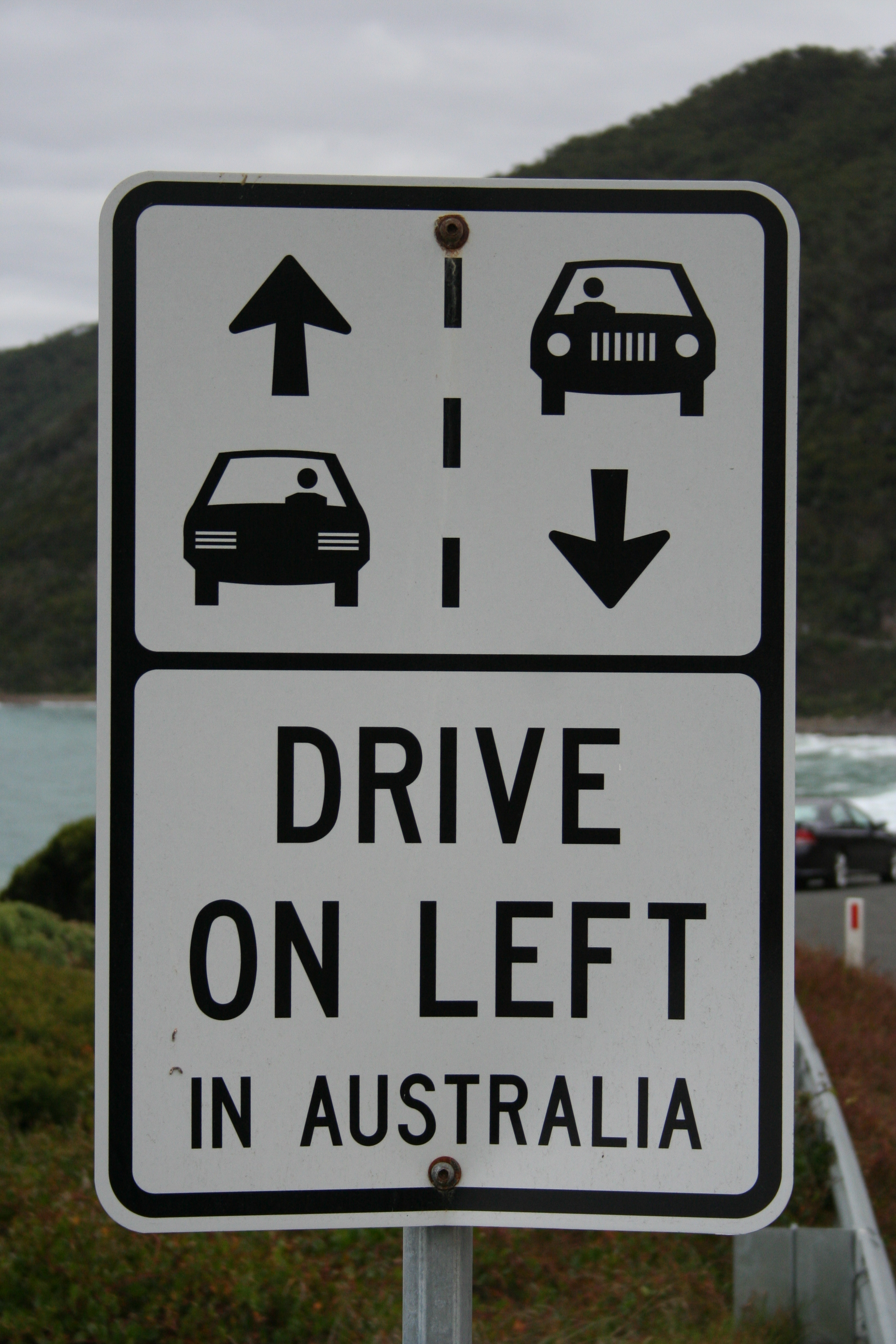
A traffic sign in Victoria, Australia, warning foreigners against potentially dangerous traffic conflicts

In transportation infrastructure, a bidirectional traffic system divides travelers into two streams of traffic that flow in opposite directions.

In the design and construction of tunnels, bidirectional traffic can markedly affect ventilation considerations.

Microscopic traffic flow models have been proposed for bidirectional automobile, pedestrian, and railway traffic. Bidirectional traffic can be observed in ant trails which have been researched for insight into human traffic models. In a macroscopic theory proposed by Laval, the interaction between fast and slow vehicles conforms to the Newell kinematic wave model of moving bottlenecks.

In air traffic control traffic is normally separated by elevation, with east bound flights at odd thousand feet elevations and west bound flights at even thousand feet elevations (1000 ft ≈ 305m). Above 28,000 ft (~8.5 km) only odd flight levels are used, with FL 290, 330, 370, etc., for eastbound flights and FL 310, 350, 390, etc., for westbound flights. Entry to and exit from airports is always one-way traffic, as runways are chosen to allow aircraft to take off and land into the wind, to reduce ground speed. Even in no wind cases, a preferred calm wind runway and direction is normally chosen and used by all flights, to avoid collisions. In uncontrolled airports, airport information can be obtained from anyone at the airport. Traffic follows a specific traffic pattern, with designated entry and exits. Radio announcements are made, whether anyone is listening or not, to allow any other traffic to be aware of other traffic in the area.

In the earliest days of railways in the United Kingdom, most lines were built double tracked because of the difficulty of coordinating operations in pre-telegraphy times.

Most modern roads carry bidirectional traffic, although one-way traffic is common in dense urban centres. Bidirectional traffic flow is believed to influence the rate of traffic collisions. In an analysis of head-on, rear-end, and lane-changing collisions based on the Simon-Gutowitz bidirectional traffic model, it was concluded that "the risk of collisions is important when the density of cars in one lane is small and ... the other lane['s] is high enough," and that "heavy vehicles cause an important reduction of traffic flow on the home lane and provoke an increase of the risk of car accident."

Bidirectional traffic is the most common form of flow observed in trails, however, some larger pedestrian concourses exhibit multidirectional traffic.
