= St Georges-super-Ely =

Village in the Vale of Glamorgan, Wales

St Georges-super-Ely: Welsh: Sain Siorys
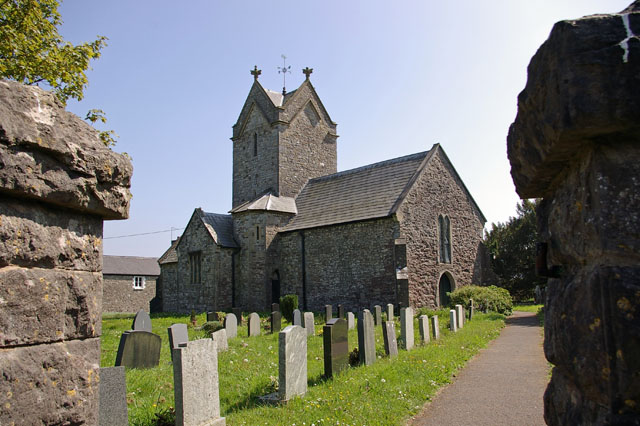
- St. George's Church

- Location within the Vale of Glamorgan
- Population: 417
- Principal area: Vale of Glamorgan
- Preserved county: South Glamorgan
- Country: Wales
- Sovereign state: United Kingdom
- Postcode district: CF
- Police: South Wales
- Fire: South Wales
- Ambulance: Welsh
- UK Parliament: Vale of Glamorgan
- Senedd Cymru – Welsh Parliament: Vale of Glamorgan
- List of places UK Wales Vale of Glamorgan 51.482706°N 3.298547°W Map of the community

St Georges-super-Ely, also known as St Georges (Welsh: Sain Siorys), is a small village and community in the western outskirts of Cardiff, in the Vale of Glamorgan, South Wales. Lying to the northwest of Culverhouse Cross, between Peterston-super-Ely and Michaelston-super-Ely, it contains a medieval church and ruined manor house dated to the fifteenth century. The community includes the settlements of St Brides-super-Ely, Drope, Downs and Sant-y-Nyll.

== History ==
In the 1870s, John Montgomery Traherne of the wealthy Traherne family was the vicar of St Georges.

== Geography ==
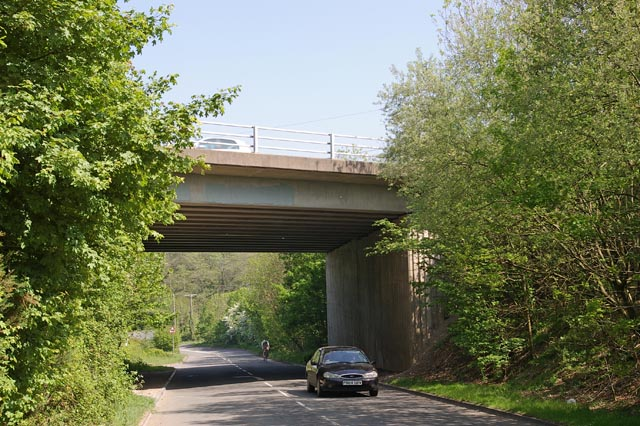
The bridge that passes over the A4232 to St Georges super Ely

St Georges super Ely lies to the northwest of Culverhouse Cross, beyond Coedarhydyglyn, and to the east of Peterston-super-Ely. It can also be accessed by road from Michaelston-super-Ely, across the A4232 road. The Cardiff-Bridgend railway and River Ely pass through the village.

== Landmarks ==
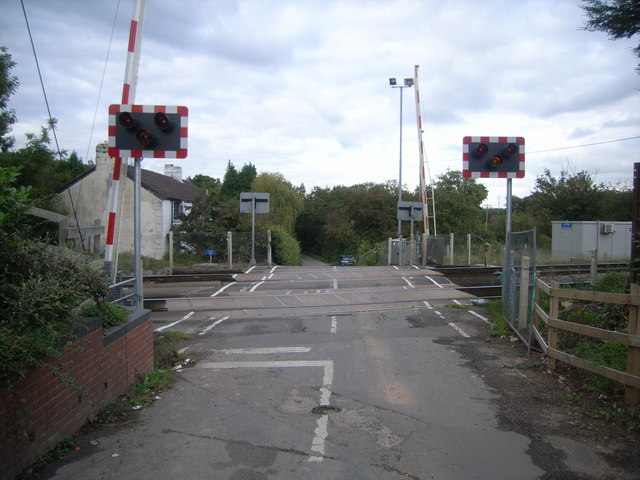
Level crossing in the village along the Cardiff to Bridgend railway

The village contains a church, dedicated to Saint George, which dates to the fourteenth century. It is Grade II* listed. Built in the form of a Greek or St. George's cross, it is described by Geoffrey R. Orrin as "one of the smallest cruciform churches in the diocese if not in Wales".

At nearby Castle Farm is the Grade I listed Castle Farmhouse, overlooking the River Ely. The medieval manor house, which was known as St George's Castle. was built by the Malefant family in the 15th century, replacing an earlier hall belonging to the Sullys. The upper chamber is now one room; it was once split into a hall and a solar. The nineteenth century mansion, Coedarhydyglyn, lies to the south of the village.
