= Michaelston-super-Ely =

Village in Cardiff, Wales

Coordinates: 51.476°N 3.270°W

Michaelston-super-Ely: Welsh: Llanfihangel-ar-Elái
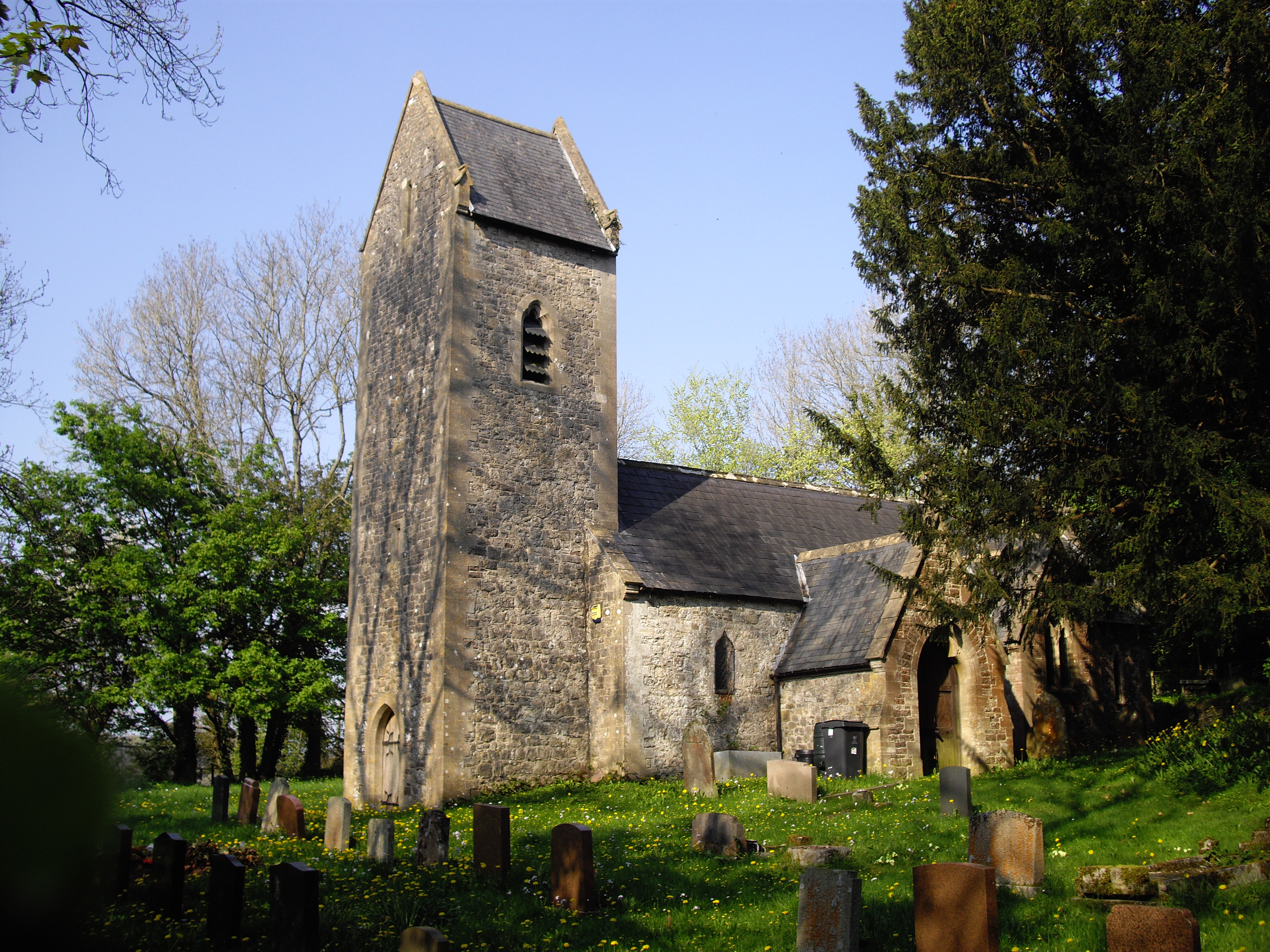
- St Michael's Church

- Location within Cardiff
- Principal area: Cardiff
- Preserved county: South Glamorgan
- Country: Wales
- Sovereign state: United Kingdom
- Post town: CARDIFF
- Postcode district: CF5
- Dialling code: 029
- Police: South Wales
- Fire: South Wales
- Ambulance: Welsh
- UK Parliament: Cardiff West
- Senedd Cymru – Welsh Parliament: Cardiff West

Michaelston-super-Ely (Welsh: Llanfihangel-ar-Elái; meaning: llan church + Mihangel Saint Michael + Elai River Ely) is a village, to the west of the city of Cardiff, Wales.

It is approximately half a mile from the boundary with the Vale of Glamorgan. To the north lies the village of St Fagans, and to the east the Ely estate. The community of Michaelston-super-Ely was joined with St Fagans in 1968.

The historic St Michael's Church was decommissioned in 2010. It is a Grade II* listed building dating from the late 12th or early 13th-century.
