= St Athan Road =

B-road, St Athan
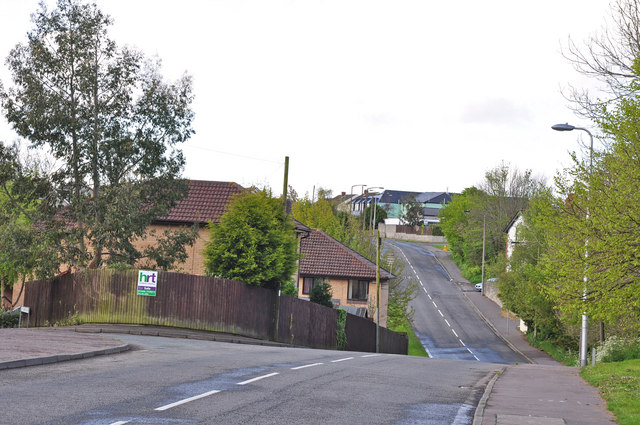

Route information
- Length: 3.7 mi (6.0 km)

Major junctions
- North end: Cowbridge
- South end: St Athan

Location
- Country: United Kingdom

Road network
- Roads in the United Kingdom; Motorways; A and B road zones

St Athan Road is the main road used to travel between Cowbridge and St Athan or further on to Barry by using the B4265 road. It begins east of Eglwys Brewis and north of East Camp where Cowbridge Road ends. It travels just past St Mary Church and directly through The Herberts, where it crosses the A48 and continues on past Llandough before finally reaching Cowbridge.

It is located 143.46 miles (230.88 km) west from the centre of London, 11.86 miles (19.09 km) west from the centre of Cardiff, 26.16 miles (42.10 km) south-east from the centre of Swansea and 31.33 miles (50.42 km) north-nest from the centre of Taunton.

The road is approximately 2.06 miles (3.32 km) from the coastal tidal high water mark.

The only other road to St Athan is the B4265 road.

== History ==
On 1 December 2013 a driver was killed in a car crash which closed the road for three hours. The car "left the carriageway" after travelling from St Athan towards Cowbridge.
