= Eglwys Brewis =

Coordinates: 51.413635°N 3.429112°W

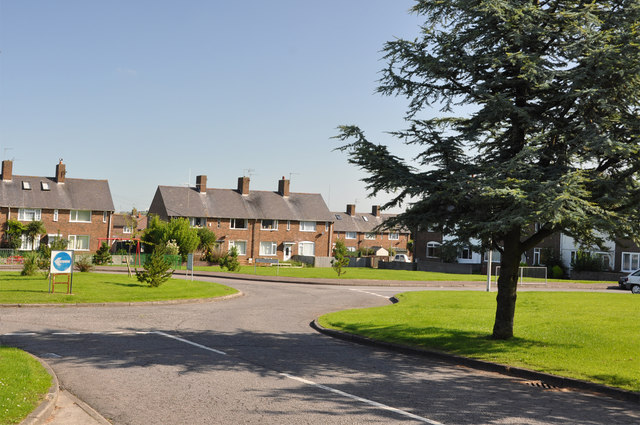
- Elm Grove, Eglwys Brewis

- Location within the Vale of Glamorgan
- OS grid reference: ST006961
- Principal area: Vale of Glamorgan
- Preserved county: South Glamorgan
- Country: Wales
- Sovereign state: United Kingdom
- Post town: Barry
- Postcode district: CF62
- Dialling code: 01446
- Police: South Wales
- Fire: South Wales
- Ambulance: Welsh
- UK Parliament: Vale of Glamorgan
- Senedd Cymru – Welsh Parliament: Vale of Glamorgan

Eglwys Brewis (Welsh: Eglwys Brewys) is a village in the Vale of Glamorgan in south Wales. It is located just to the north of the village of St Athan, south of Flemingston and northeast of Llantwit Major. Greenlands and St Mary Church lie to the north by road from Eglwys Brewis. The village consists primarily of residential estates which were originally built in the mid-20th century for service families stationed at nearby RAF St Athan. The estates are regularly used by driving instructors in the Vale of Glamorgan. Nant y Stepsau flows in the vicinity.

== History ==
A Topographical Dictionary of The Dominion of Wales (1811) by Nicholas Carlisle said:

"EGLWYS BREWIS, in the Cwmwd of Maenor Glynn Ogwr, Cantref of Cron Nedd (now called the Hundred of Ogmore), County of GLAMORGAN, South Wales: a discharged Rectory, valued in the King's Books at £3..18..6 1/2: Patron, The Rev. Mr. Rickards: Church dedicated to St. Brise. The Resident Population of this Parish, in 1801, was 33. The Money raised by the Parish Rates, in 1803, was £37..19..0, at 2s. in the pound. It is 4 m. S. b. E. from Cowbridge. This Parish is all inclosed. According to the Diocesan Report, in 1809, the yearly value of this Benefice, arising from Tythes, was £73..16..4."

A Topographical Dictionary of Great Britain (1833) by John Gorton said:

"The EGLWYS BREWIS, co. Glamorgan, S.W. P. T. Cowbridge (173) 4 m. S E. Pop. 20. A very small parish in the Hundred of Cowbridge, situated upon the Bristol Channel; living, a dis. rectory in the diocese of St. David's and province of Canterbury; valued in P. R. 37/. 1!)*.; church ded.' to St. Bride; patron, — Rickards, Esq."

Only a hamlet still in the early 20th century, Eglwys Brewis developed into a dormitory village with housing estates in the mid-20th century to accommodate service families stationed at nearby RAF St Athan. Most of the houses on the estates surrounding the base were sold off.

== Politics and administration ==
Eglwys Brewis lies within the Flemingston & Eglwys Brewis community electoral ward, being allocated three councillor seats to sit on the St Athan Community Council.

However, only half of Eglwys Brewis is within the St Athan ward as part of the Vale of Glamorgan county council.

== Notable landmarks ==
Eglwys Brewis contains the St Brise Parish Church of St. Brewis and Bethesda'r Fro Congregational Church. It contains one pub, the Moonshine, formerly the Carpenter's Arms. The parish church, which became a Grade II listed building on 18 May 2002, is a small stone church dating to the 12th–13th century with 16th-century windows. It contains a square stone castellated bell-cot at the western end of the nave and a Norman tub font and inscriptions. To the east is the RAF St Athan Golf Club.

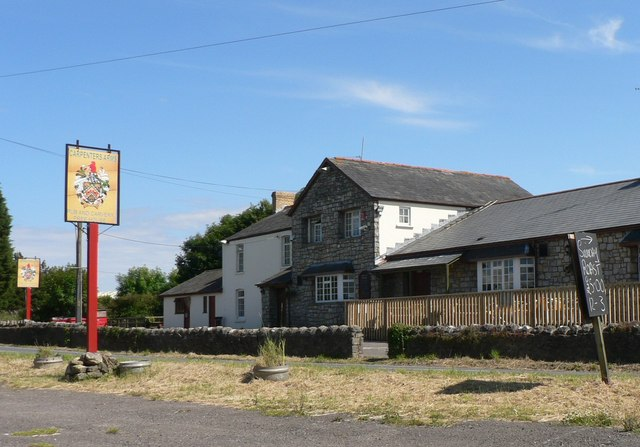
The Carpenter's Arms
