= Flemingston =

Village in the Vale of Glamorgan, Wales

Coordinates: 51.42492°N 3.418101°W

Flemingston: Welsh: Trefflemin
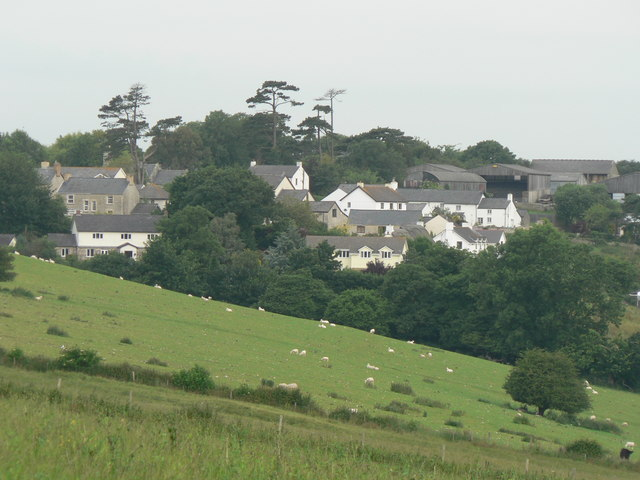

- Location within the Vale of Glamorgan
- OS grid reference: ST017701
- Principal area: Vale of Glamorgan
- Preserved county: South Glamorgan
- Country: Wales
- Sovereign state: United Kingdom
- Postcode district: CF
- Police: South Wales
- Fire: South Wales
- Ambulance: Welsh
- UK Parliament: Vale of Glamorgan
- Senedd Cymru – Welsh Parliament: Vale of Glamorgan

Flemingston (Welsh: Trefflemin) (previously known in English as Michaelston Le Mont, Flimston or Flimstone, and in Welsh as Llanfihangel y Twyn) is a small village in the Vale of Glamorgan in south Wales. It is located 8.5 miles (13.7 km) northwest by road from the town centre of Barry. It contains the Church of St. Michael the Archangel, the ruins of Flemingston Court, and Flemingston Manor or Grange, all of which are listed buildings. Historically, the parish of Flemingston was a sub-manor of Aberthaw or St Athan.

== Etymology ==
The village was anciently known as Llanfihangel y Twyn (the Llan of Saint Michael on the hillock), following the Norman invasion of Wales this name was commonly transliterated into Michaelston Le Mont. Robert Fitzhamon gifted both the castle and the "Lordship of St George" to Sir John le Fleming, whose family maintained possession for generations. As such, the names Flimston, Flimstone and Flemingston gradually came into use. The Welsh version of this name, Trefflemin is a modern appellation.

== History ==
The area is part of the Cantref of Gorfynydd, historically part of the kingdom of Glamorgan. John le Fleming is said to have gained the manors of St. George, Wenvoe, Flemingston, and Llanmaes. Fleming was married to Amicia, daughter of Baldwin Magnus, Lord of Whitney. Fleming gave the manors of Flemingston and Constantine Walles to a younger son. In 1317, Flemingston was held by Philip le Fleming. It continued in his descendants until, on failure of issue male, William Fleming sold the estate to Lewis Thomas of Bettws; while an alternate account states that the le Fleming line ended in an heiress, who married a Thomas, of Llanfihangel, through whom a sale of the property was made to the Wyndhams of Dunraven.

In 1801, the population amounted to 66 residents. A Topographical Dictionary of The Dominion of Wales (1811) by Nicholas Carlisle described Flemingston as belonging to what is now called the Hundred of Cowbridge, within the County of Glamorgan. Thomas Wyndham was the patron of the rectory, and the village church was dedicated to St. Michael. The John Marius Wilson's Imperial Gazetteer of England and Wales (1870–72) states that the Flemingston parish was within the Bridgend district or Glamorgan. The population included approximately 63 residents, and there were ten houses. Flemingston was described as being one estate, the manor belonging to Sir John Fleming, one of the twelve knights who came in with Fitzhamon in the time of William Rufus. The rectory, part of the diocese of Llandaff had a patron, the Earl of Dunraven.

== Politics and Administration ==
Flemingston exists within the Flemingston % Eglwys Brewis community electoral ward, being allocated three councillor seats to sit on the St Athan Community Council.

=== 2017 Flemingston Community Ward Election ===
2017 Flemingston Community Election
Party	Candidate	Votes	%	±%
Independent	David Crompton	218	30.40%	
Independent	Roger Eustace	195	27.2%	
Labour	James Cullinane	172	23.99%	
Pirate	David A Elston	125	17.43%	
Spoilt Ballots		7	0.98%	
Majority				
Turnout		717		
Independent hold		Swing		
Labour gain from Pirate		Swing		

== Geography ==
The village is approximately 3.5 miles (5.6 km) south-southeast from Cowbridge, 9.25 miles (14.89 km) south-southwest of Llantrisant, 2 miles (3.2 km) north of St Athan, and it is also north of Eglwys Brewis and RAF St Athan. Flemingston is connected to the villages of St Mary Church, Vale of Glamorgan and St Hilary, Vale of Glamorgan to the north; and Tre-Aubrey and Llantrithyd to the northeast. The River Thaw flows to the east across Flemingston Moor; excavations on the moor have unearthed some pottery dated to the 12th-13th centuries. The Nant y Stepsau also flows to the southwest. In the 19th century, Flemingston parish was approximately 600 or 672 acres in size.

== Notable landmarks ==
The following landmarks are listed historic buildings: Church of St. Michael the Archangel (grade II*), Flemingston Court Farmhouse (II*), Detached Kitchen at Flemingston Court (II), Garden Wall and House Ruins at Flemingston Manor (II), Combination farm buildings at Flemingston Court Farm (II), Telephone Call-Box north of parish church (II) and Gregory Farm / Yr Hen Fferm Dy (II).

Church

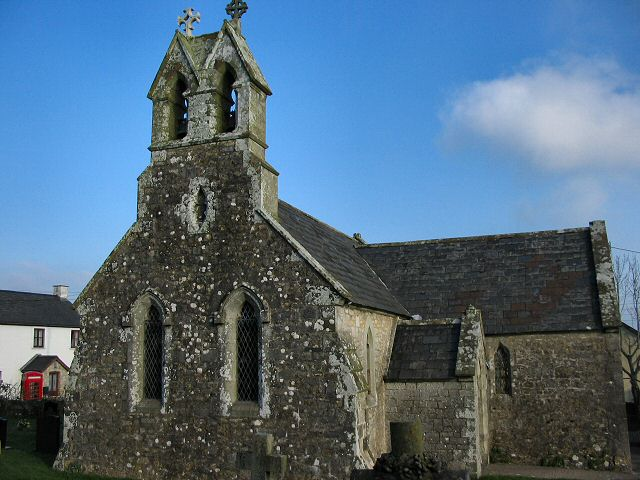
Church of St. Michael the Archangel

This stone church with a slate roof was built upon 11th century foundations. Although most of the church dates to the 19th century, some remains of the 14th-century church remain. It became a Grade II* listed building on 18 June 2002. The church contains a monumental stone slab bearing a full-length effigy of a lady, probably dating from the 14th century. The name "Elizabeth" can be made out, and she may be a member of the Fleming family. Some castle remains adjoin the churchyard.

Dwellings

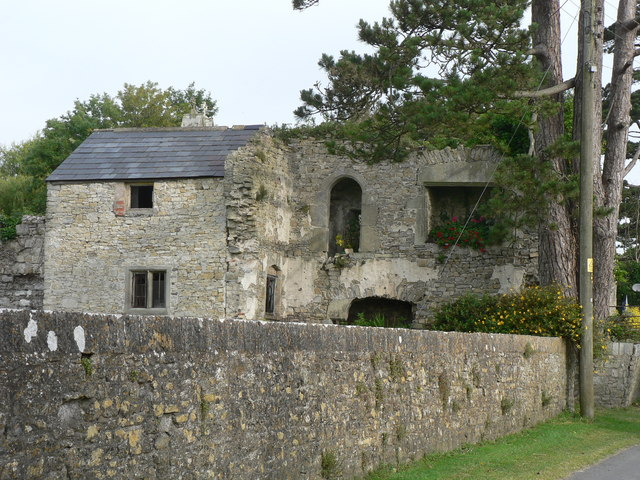
Flemingston Court and Garden Wall

Flemingston Court dates to the first half of the 16th century and possibly functioned as a rectory or steward or farm manager's house. Flemingston Court Farmhouse dates to the 16th century and is a two-storey rubble and slate roof building. It contains eaves, gables, stone end stacks, a font stack, and an exposed chimney breast. Additional features are its windows, casements, moulded stone mullions, and drip-moulds. It became a Grade II* listed building on 18 June 2002. Its barn dates to the mid 19th century. The detached kitchen building, which became a Grade II listed building on 18 June 2003, dates to the early 16th century and may have been part of a later 17th-century renovation.

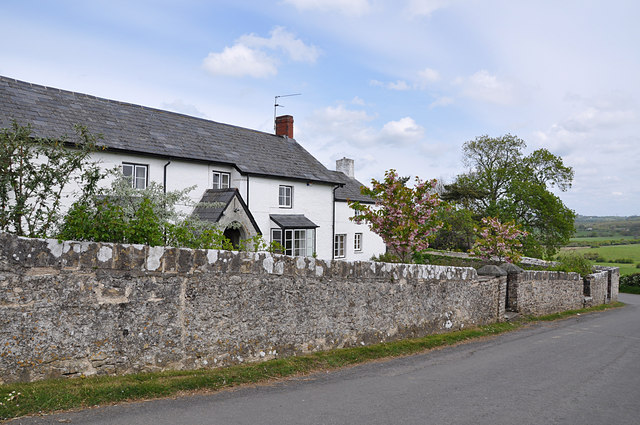
Yr Hen Fferm Dy

Yr Hen Fferm Dy, also known as Gregory Farm, has a white painted rubble farmhouse dated to the 17th century but refashioned in the 18th and 19th centuries. It became a Grade II listed building on 18 June 2007. The rectory is located in the northern part of the village in a wooded garden and dates to the 19th century. Rose Cottage is dated to the 16th or 17th century, built from rubble stone, with a thatched roof and "eyebrow windows".

== Notable people ==
The poet, Iolo Morganwg (Edward Williams; 1747–1826), was from Flemingston. Homeschooled by his mother, he learned to read by watching his father carve words on tombstones.

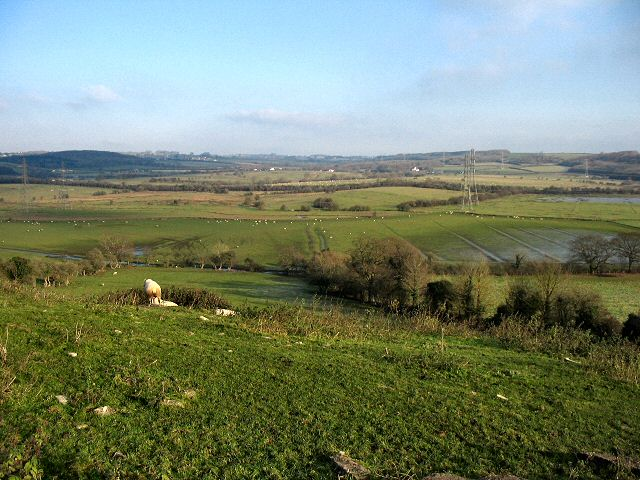
Flemingston Moor

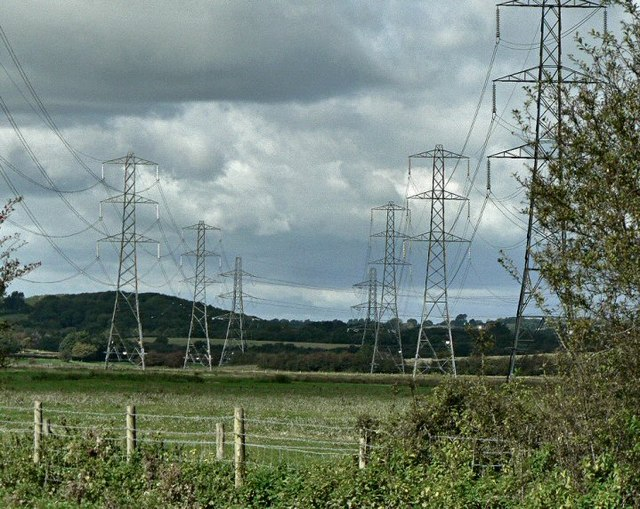
Pylons on Flemingston Moor

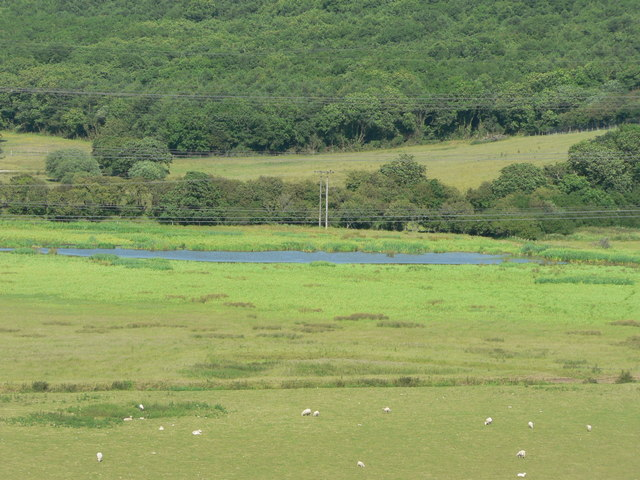
River Thaw, Flemingston Moor

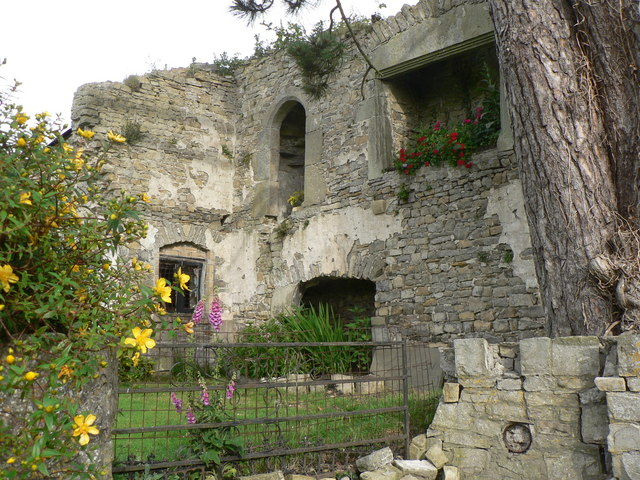
Ruins at Flemingston Court
