= St Athan =

St Athan: Welsh: Sain Tathan
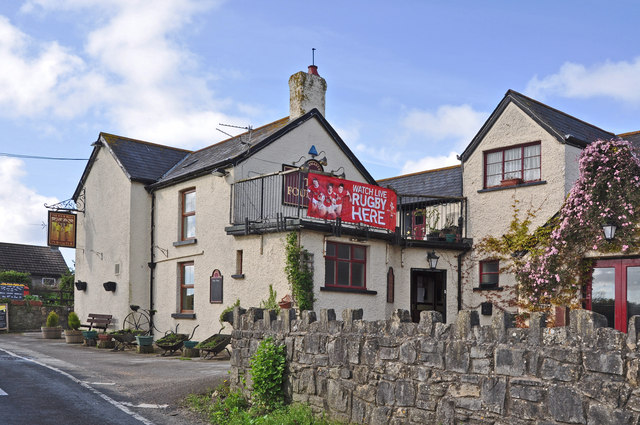
- The Four Bells, St Athan

- Location within the Vale of Glamorgan
- Population: 4,495 (community and ward 2011)
- OS grid reference: ST017680
- Principal area: Vale of Glamorgan
- Preserved county: South Glamorgan
- Country: Wales
- Sovereign state: United Kingdom
- Post town: Barry
- Postcode district: CF62
- Dialling code: 01446
- Police: South Wales
- Fire: South Wales
- Ambulance: Welsh
- UK Parliament: Vale of Glamorgan
- Senedd Cymru – Welsh Parliament: Vale of Glamorgan
- List of places UK Wales Vale of Glamorgan 51.402°N 3.416°W Map of the community

St Athan (Welsh: Sain Tathan) is a village and community in the Vale of Glamorgan in South Wales. The village and its parish church are dedicated to Saint Tathan. The church dates to the 13th–14th century, though an earlier church was dated to the Norman period. The village and the adjacent dormitory village of Eglwys Brewis are known primarily for the MOD St Athan RAF base. There are two pubs in the village, as well as a football team at St Athan Football Club and the St Athan Golf Club. The community includes West Aberthaw.

== Geography ==
Located in the Vale of Glamorgan, St Athan lies off the B4265 road, roughly 8 miles (13 km) by road northwest of downtown Barry. A 1632 survey defined the boundaries of the manor of St Athan by Eglwys Brewis and Castleton to the north; South Orchard, West Orchard and Llantwit Major to the west, Gileston and the Bristol Channel to the south; and East Orchard and the River Thaw to the east.

=== Climate ===
Climate data for St Athan (1991–2020 normals)
Month	Jan	Feb	Mar	Apr	May	Jun	Jul	Aug	Sep	Oct	Nov	Dec	Year
Record high °C (°F)	14.5 (58.1)	16.8 (62.2)	20.0 (68.0)	24.7 (76.5)	30.5 (86.9)	34.6 (94.3)	32.9 (91.2)	33.5 (92.3)	28.8 (83.8)	26.3 (79.3)	18.0 (64.4)	16.7 (62.1)	34.6 (94.3)
Mean daily maximum °C (°F)	8.2 (46.8)	8.4 (47.1)	10.2 (50.4)	12.9 (55.2)	15.9 (60.6)	18.5 (65.3)	20.2 (68.4)	20.0 (68.0)	18.1 (64.6)	14.7 (58.5)	11.2 (52.2)	8.7 (47.7)	13.9 (57.0)
Daily mean °C (°F)	5.7 (42.3)	5.7 (42.3)	7.2 (45.0)	9.4 (48.9)	12.2 (54.0)	15.0 (59.0)	16.8 (62.2)	16.7 (62.1)	14.8 (58.6)	11.8 (53.2)	8.6 (47.5)	6.2 (43.2)	10.9 (51.6)
Mean daily minimum °C (°F)	3.1 (37.6)	3.0 (37.4)	4.2 (39.6)	5.8 (42.4)	8.6 (47.5)	11.5 (52.7)	13.4 (56.1)	13.5 (56.3)	11.5 (52.7)	9.0 (48.2)	5.9 (42.6)	3.7 (38.7)	7.8 (46.0)
Record low °C (°F)	−8.5 (16.7)	−6.3 (20.7)	−5.8 (21.6)	−2.7 (27.1)	1.5 (34.7)	4.9 (40.8)	6.6 (43.9)	6.4 (43.5)	3.7 (38.7)	−1.7 (28.9)	−8.4 (16.9)	−9.6 (14.7)	−9.6 (14.7)
Average precipitation mm (inches)	100.5 (3.96)	76.3 (3.00)	70.7 (2.78)	63.0 (2.48)	64.1 (2.52)	66.2 (2.61)	80.6 (3.17)	97.7 (3.85)	81.5 (3.21)	112.8 (4.44)	111.1 (4.37)	118.8 (4.68)	1,043.2 (41.07)
Average precipitation days (≥ 1.0 mm)	15.2	12.1	11.9	10.8	10.6	10.1	11.2	13.2	11.7	15.1	15.9	15.7	153.4
Mean monthly sunshine hours	56.0	85.0	128.0	181.8	226.3	217.1	220.2	189.8	160.5	108.8	66.3	52.1	1,691.8
Source 1: Met Office
Source 2: Starlings Roost Weather

== History ==
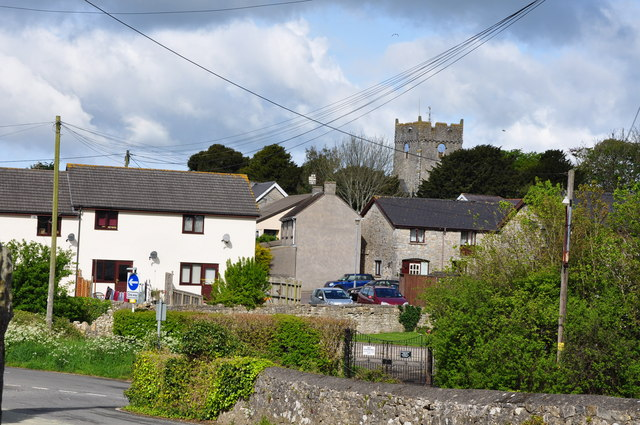
The village and parish church in the distance

=== Origins ===
Legend holds that Tathan was an Irish monk who was in a boat which ran aground at Portskewett, after being blown across the Bristol Channel, around 540 AD. He founded a monastery and school and is said to have been buried in the orchard of the vicarage at Caerwent. However, somewhat confusingly, a Tathan the Younger is said to be buried at St Athan Parish Church, although the exact location of the grave is unknown. Others say the village obtained its name from Tathana, granddaughter of Meuric ap Tewdric of Trebeferad (Boverton), who lived a humble life as a nun in a mud hut on the River Thaw, near the Old Mill; she was associated with the monastic school of nearby Llantwit Major, and was buried at the church.

=== Early history ===
Historical records indicate that in the Taxatio (1291) and Valor Ecclesiasticus (1535) the village was named Llandathan and the parish church named simply Tathana's. St Athan's comprised three sub-manors: Castleton, East Orchard, and West Orchard. The early history of the parish of Eglwys Brewis records that it was situated in the manor of St Athan and was held by the same lordship as that of Castleton. Roman coins have been discovered in the vicinity including a find in 1798 in a field between St Athan and Eglwys Brewis. The Castleton manor existed in St Athan from the Norman period under the lordship of the Nerber family. Norman castles were later constructed in West Orchard and East Orchard as manorial residences. In 1320, a Richard de Nerber was said to have "retained only half a knight's fee at St Athan." However, from around 1240, the Berkerolles family appear to have received entitlements to the manorial estates of West and East Orchard and built a new manor house in West Orchard and later at East Orchard in 1377. The earlier Norman castles appear to have been destroyed by Ifor Bach. The Berkerolles family's influence grew stronger in the 14th century. Sir Roger Berkerolles died in 1351; a tomb is dedicated to him in the parish church, which also contains his parents' remains. The current church is mainly dated to the 14th century and it is thought the Norman church originally here was ordered to be rebuilt by the Berkerolles. Later, the manor fell under the Stradling family.

=== Modern history ===
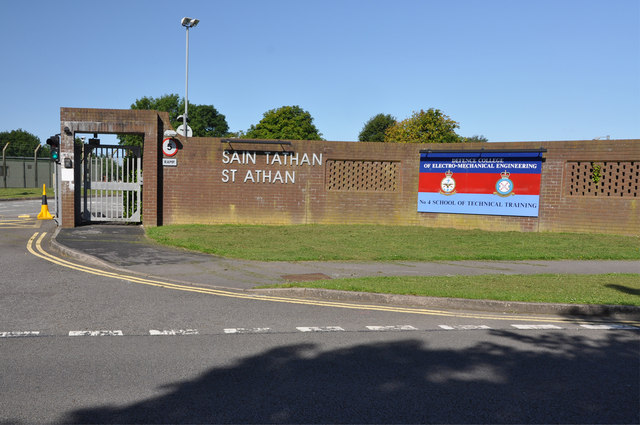
Entrance to MOD St Athan

In 1811, A Topographical Dictionary of the Dominion of Wales by Nicholas Carlisle included the following entry on St Athan:

ATHAN, ST., in the Cwmwd of Maenor Glynn Ogwr, Cantref of Cron Nedd (now called the Hundred of Ogmore), County of GLAMORGAN, South Wales: a Rectory, valued in the King's Books at £15..9..7: Patron, Robert Jones, Esq.: Church dedicated to St. Athanasius. The Resident Population of this Parish, in 1801, was 264. The Money raised by the Parish Rates, in 1803, was £125..17..1, at 1s..8d. in the pound. It is 6 1/2 m. S. from Cowbridge. This Parish contains 1300 Acres of cultivated Land. In this Parish are the ruins of East Orchard, one of the twelve Norman Castles, and the Site of West Orchard, another Castle of later date: As well as the Port of West Aber Ddaw, so much noted for the superiority of its Lime.

In 1847, the village had a population of about 379 people.

The village was served by St Athan Road railway station between 1892 and 1930. There is no longer any local rail connection.

Although a settlement has existed at St Athan for over a thousand years, St Athan and its dormitory village of Eglwys Brewis significantly enlarged around the nearby MOD St Athan RAF base. This unit is home to the Special Forces Support Group, the DSG large aircraft maintenance unit and an element of the Defence School of Electronic and Mechanical Engineering. In 2010 it was announced that a proposed £14 billion defence training academy, which would have created 2,000 jobs, had been cancelled by the government as part of the 8% cut in the Strategic Defence and Security Review.

On 11 February 2009 two Air Experience Flights by the Air Training Corps left RAF St Athan and collided in mid-air, killing the pilots and two female Cadets. An investigation was launched.

On 23 February 2016 Aston Martin announced that their new factory to build its DBX crossover model would be located on the airfield at St Athan. Construction of the 90-acre site would commence in 2017, with a total investment of $280 million and the creation of 750 jobs. The factory would be located in the existing buildings on the site. The U.S. state of Alabama, along with two UK sites and a Middle Eastern location, had been on Aston's shortlist for the factory. Aston unveiled the DBX at the 2015 Geneva Auto Show; DBX production will start in 2020 with an output of up to 5,000 units a year envisaged.

== Politics and administration ==
=== St Athan Community Council ===
St Athan Community Council
- All of council elected every five years

Type
- Type: Community council

Leadership
- Chairperson: Cllr Roger Eustace

Structure
- Seats: 13
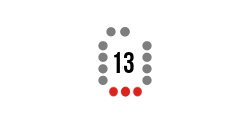
- Independent: 10 / 13
- Labour Party: 3 / 13

Meeting place
- The Old School Hall

Website
- http://www.stathancommunitycouncil.org.uk/

St Athan has a community council of 13 seats, including a chairperson, and separately one clerk. The council represents the three community wards of St Athan, Gileston and Flemingston. The chairperson sits at the top of the table, with deputy to chair's right and clerk to chair's left.

==== Political make-up ====
Year	Independent	Labour	Pirate
2017	10	3	0
2016	12	0	1

==== Community ward remit ====
The community ward of St Athan includes the Village of St Athan and the Castleton Residential Park.

The community ward of Flemingston includes the village of Flemingston, half the village of Eglwys Brewis (which is split between the Ex MOD housing estate West Camp, the Northern "Bird's Estate"), the East Camp Ex-MOD housing estate which does not make up any village, the hamlet of New Barn and the area known as Beggars Pound.

The community ward of Gileston covers the village of Gileston, the soon-to-be housing estate of the Old Boys Village, the houses collected within West Aberthaw and Limpert Bay.

=== County council ===
See also St Athan (electoral ward)

St Athan is the name of the electoral ward, coterminous with the community, which elects one county councillor to the Vale of Glamorgan Council.

The current county councillor, Cllr John Thomas, has been the incumbent since the 1999 election when he beat the sitting Labour councillor by only 17 votes. He became leader of the council in May 2017.

== Notable buildings and monuments ==
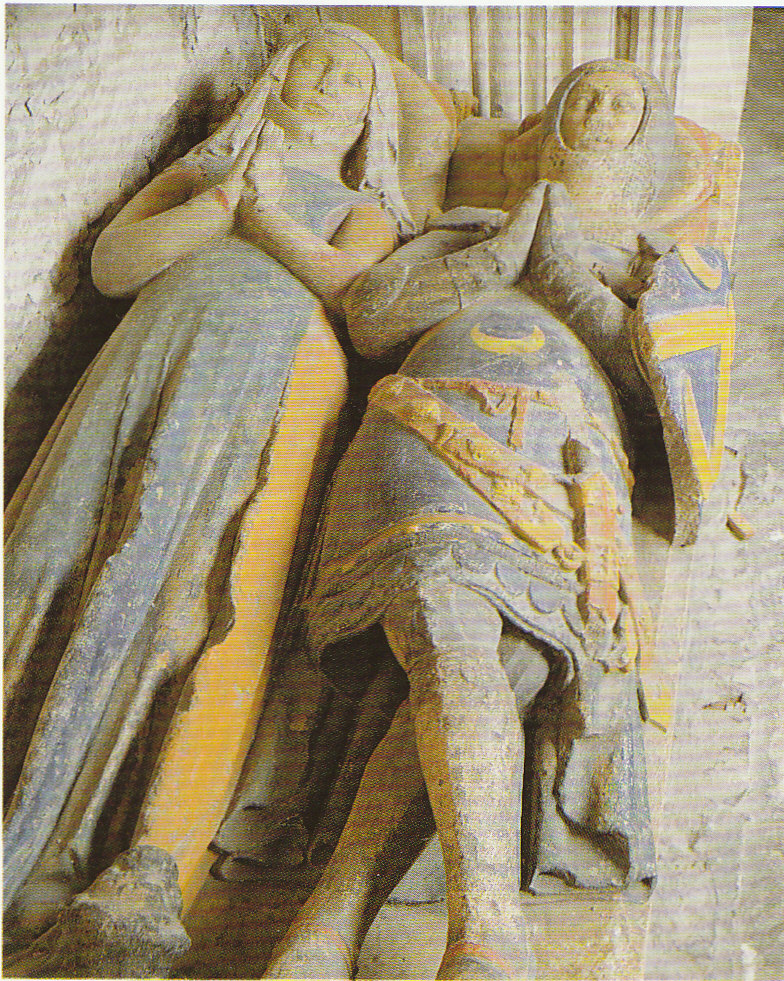
Tomb of Katherine Turberville and her husband, Sir Roger Berkerolles, within the Church of St Athan.

The following landmarks are listed buildings of St Athan and its sub-manors:

St Athan	Church of St Athan (I); Anonymous Monument and railings in Churchyard of Church of St Athan (II); St Athan War Memorial (II); The Old Rectory (Balfour House) (II); Myrtle Cottage and out buildings (II); West Farmhouse (II); West Orchard Farmhouse (II); Aderyn [Prev. part of West Orchard Farmhouse] (II)
Castleton	Castleton Farmhouse (II*); Bakehouse and Donkey Stable at Castleton Farmhouse (II); Former Barn at Castleton Farm (II)
East Orchard	Retainers Hall at East Orchard [part remains of East Orchard Castle] II (SAM); Dovecote at East Orchard [part of remains of East Orchard Castle] II (SAM)
Eglwys Brewis	Church of St. Brise (II*)

Parish Church of St Athan

The main entrance to the Grade I listed Parish Church of St Athan (partially restored 1888–90) lies on the south porch, which contains the remains of a sundial and displays the Berkerolles coat of arms, dated to the 13th or 14th century. The windows are dated to the 14th century and the tomb in the south wall remains untouched, although the tomb in the west window was restored in 1934. The large rounded font which stands on a square three-foot high base is made of Sutton stone retrieved from the Ogmore River and appears to date to the earlier Norman church. The church bells date to 1635, 1707, 1720 and 1744, and two further bells were added in 1919; this is commemorated next to the hymn board. The church contains effigies of Sir Roger Berkerolles and his wife, Katherine Turberville, eldest sister of Sir Richard Turberville of Coity Castle.

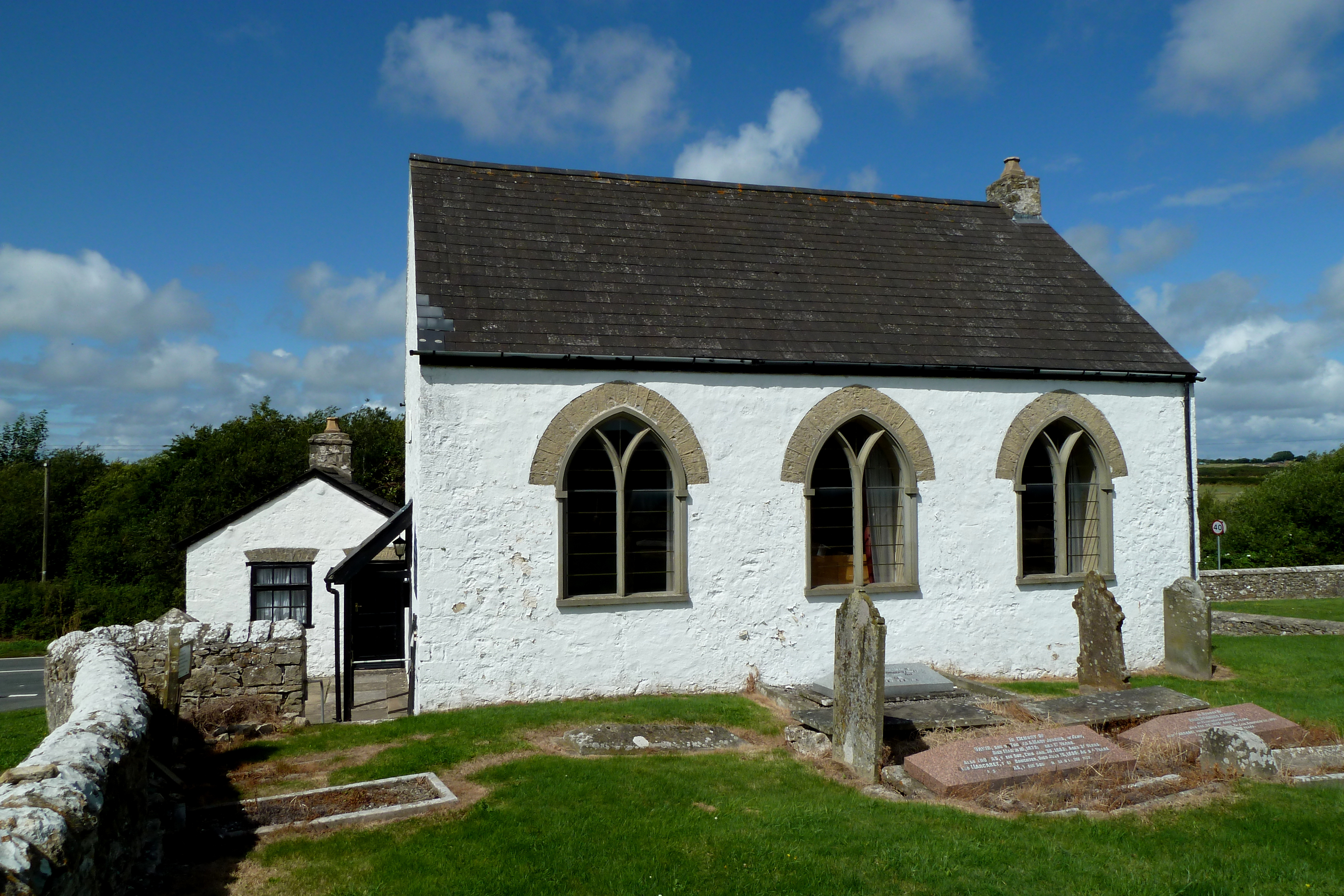
Bethesda'r Fro Chapel, near St Athan West Camp

Bethesda'r Fro Chapel

The Bethesda'r Fro Chapel, a United Reformed Church chapel, dates from 1807. Roger's Lane, a lane leading from St Athan to the chapel is reportedly haunted and phantom funerals have been reported in the area with witnesses hearing funeral music and a procession and nobody being there. One elderly farmer recognized several of the mourners and the procession halted before a house before vanishing. St Athan is also said to be haunted by a lady in white.

Old Rectory

The Old Rectory is dated to the early to mid-19th century. Built of stone, the porch included fluted pilasters. The Old Rectory was converted to a school in around 1960 but now contains flats.

=== Dwellings ===
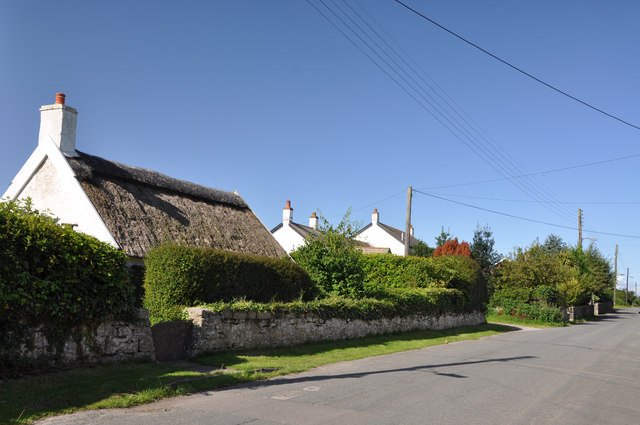
Myrtle Cottage

A number of dwellings in the village hold listed status in recognition of their special architectural or historic interest. Cadw, the governmental body that administers the listings, designated Myrtle Cottage as Grade II. It is the last cottage in the area with a thatched roof, and retains period features such as heavy oak beams and an old iron bread-oven. New Barn Cottage, a 3 bedroom formerly-thatched cottage was part of the Radcliffe estate until it was sold in 1928. The Croft is a cottage which dates to the late 19th or early 20th century and is noted for its rounded-head door opening and symmetrical facade. Also of note is The Willows, a late-17th-century farmhouse which once featured in Glamorgan Farmhouses.

East Orchard, a castle within the village, was built in 1691 by Roger Berkerolles; curiously, in 1843, a wild fig tree grew out of the cement of the chapel walls. West Farm is a Grade II listed building, dated to the early 16th century with 19th-century alterations. Formerly thatched roofed, it has "dressed stone tudor-arched doorways, straight-cut with fillet ceiling timbers and gable-entry stone stairs" and "castellated stone bay windows". West Orchard Farm is also a Grade II listed building, c. 17th century. Its unusual architectural features include its five inline chimneys, a "Tudor arched doorway, broad chamfered beams and gabled porch".

=== Monuments ===
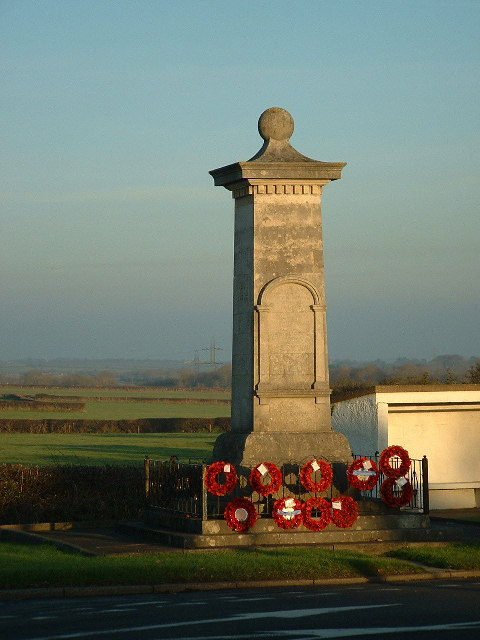
St Athan War Memorial

The war memorial is located on the grass along the B4265 road at Gileston Cross to the south of the village. It was built in around 1920 to commemorate those who died during the First World War. The memorial, built from Portland stone ashlar, is a square pillar raised on three steps with a dentilated cornice, capped by a ball. The Church of St Athan contains monuments of the Berkerolles family with recumbent figures of a knight and his lady.

=== Former holiday camp ===
See St Athan's Boys Village.

== Education ==
St Athan Primary School was first mentioned in 1847 and was located in what is now the Old Community Centre, built by the Rayers in about 1860. A new school was built in the mid-1960s and was inaugurated in September 1966. In November 1995 the nursery was established.

St Athan Library is located on Old Church Lane. The library is currently moving from County Council control to a Community Charity after a consultation took place between October and December 2014.

There is also the local newspaper The Llantwit Major GEM. and the MOD St Athan magazine Tathan.

== Economy ==
The village has a post office, a Londis, a Laser and tattoo removal service, a pharmacy, an Esso petrol station and an Aston Martin Lagonda auto plant.

Also see:

- Defence Aviation Repair Agency
- Army Base Repair Organisation
- Aberthaw Power Station
- MOD St Athan
- Enterprise Zone

== Transport ==
St Athan has had three train stations in the past but are now closed, the Gileston railway station, the St Athan Railway Station aka St Athan Halt and St Athan Road Railway Station.

Taxi services also run to St Athan as a part of the Vale of Glamorgan.

Bus services include the 303, 905 and the X91 X91 bus is no longer available

== Culture ==
=== Current ===
There are two pubs in the village, the Three Horse Shoes and The Roost on Rock Road. There is also a skate park and two community centres, one of which holds an annual fun-day. The village has a football team and the St Athan Golf Club.

St Athan is the poorest rural area in the Vale of Glamorgan.

=== Mythology ===
Y Ladi Wen is said to be connected with the village of St Athan.
