= East Orchard Castle =

Ruins in the Vale of Glamorgan, Wales

- Castell Berllan Dwyrain (Welsh)
- St Athan, Vale of Glamorgan in Wales
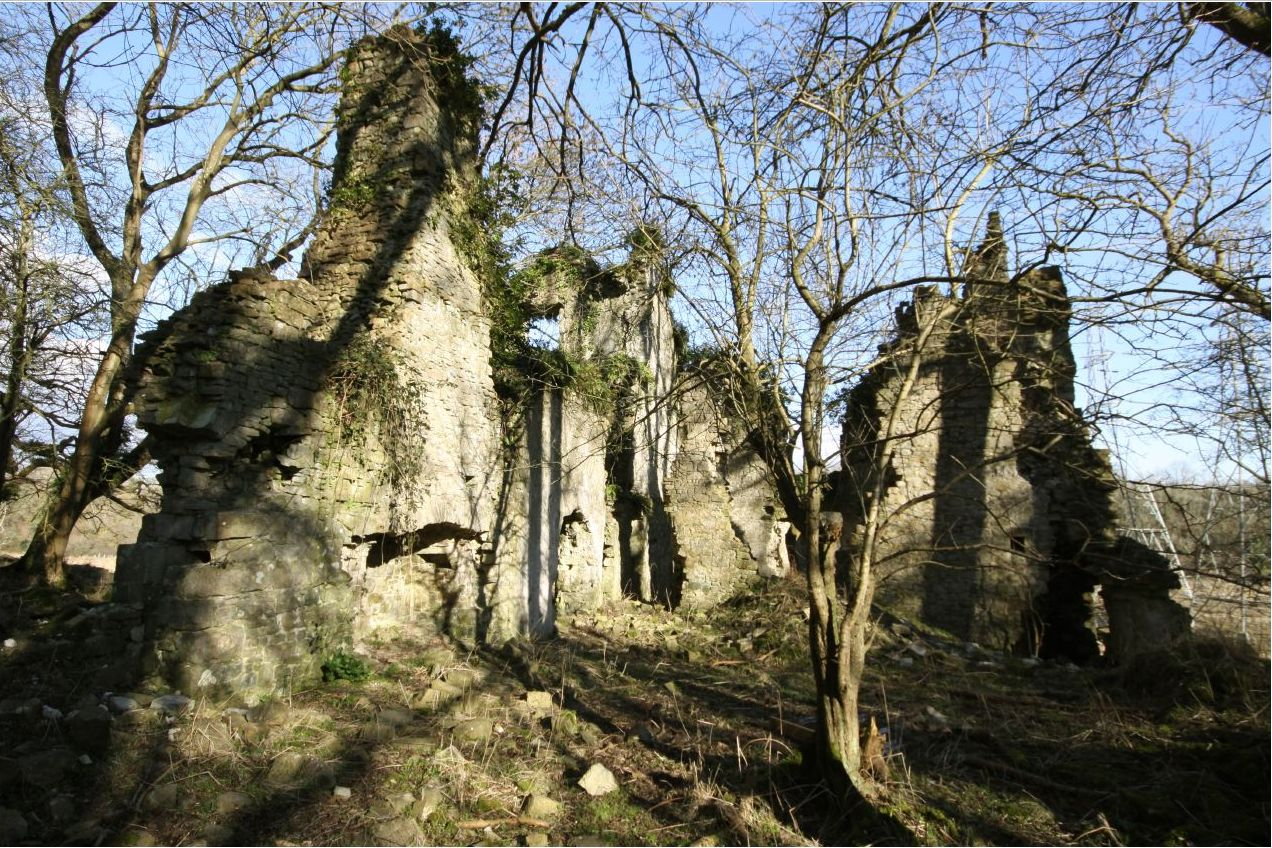
- East Orchard Castle Ruins

Site information
- Type: Manor House
- Owner: Unknown
- Condition: Ruined

Location
- Location within Vale of Glamorgan
- Coordinates: 51.403°N 3.398°W
- Area: Around 2 Acres

Site history
- Built: 1399–1413
- Built by: the Berkerolles
- In use: Public footpath runs directly adjacent to the castle affording splendid views of it; the castle itself is on private land.
- Materials: Rock
- Battles/wars: Marauders from the hills
- Events: Destroyed by Llywelyn Bren (1316); Rebuilt (14th century); Dismantled (from 1756)

Garrison information
- Occupants: (previously) The Berkerolles

Listed Building – Grade II

East Orchard Castle is a ruined building near St Athan in the Vale of Glamorgan, Wales, whose remains date mainly from the 14th century.

== History ==
While it is called a castle, it was not fortified in the style of one and is officially classed as post-medieval and broadly defined as a domestic manor house dwelling. The historic site in its entirety contains a manor house, a barn, a chapel and a dovecote (able to house roughly 200 birds). It was destroyed by Llywelyn Bren, probably during the revolt of 1316.

The Orchards were built by the Berkerolles family, who received the land from Robert Fitzhammon after the conquest of Glamorgan 1091. It was passed to the Stradling family from St Donats in the 1400s, who improved the building over the centuries before selling it in 1756.

It has been in ruins since the late 18th century, the house having been dismantled from 1756. Some features such as windows and fireplaces are still visible in the main section of the manor house. It is likely that the barn has been used as a farm building more recently, as this section is in better condition than the rest of the property.

The Royal Commission on the Ancient and Historical Monuments of Wales have a number of drawings of East Orchard Castle.

It is located on the eastern boundary of the St Athan community, approximately 1100 metres east of the Church of St Athan on the low cliff on the west side of the River Thaw, and is generally accessed by the lands of Rock Farm. There is a small stone bridge over a run-off of the river thaw that is likely related to the build of the castle (see image below).

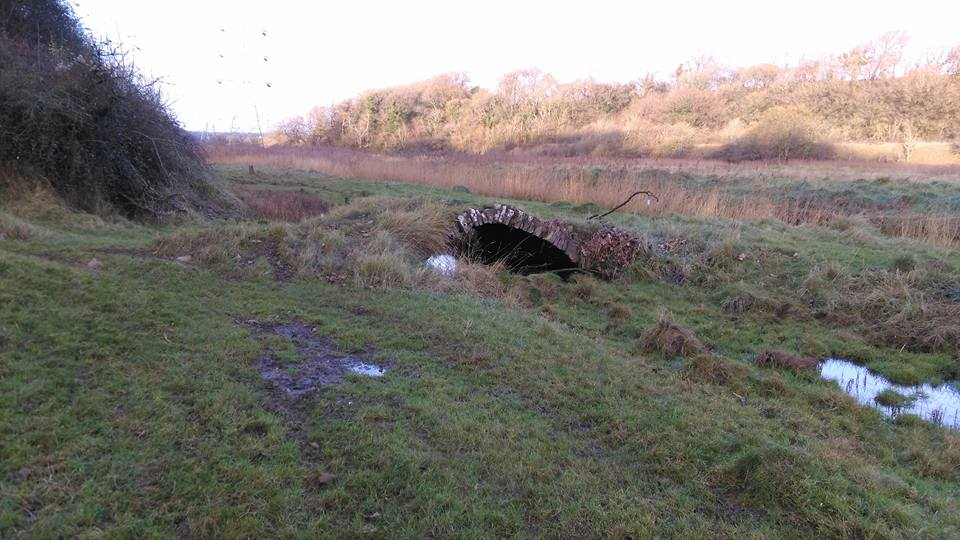
East Orchard Castle Bridge

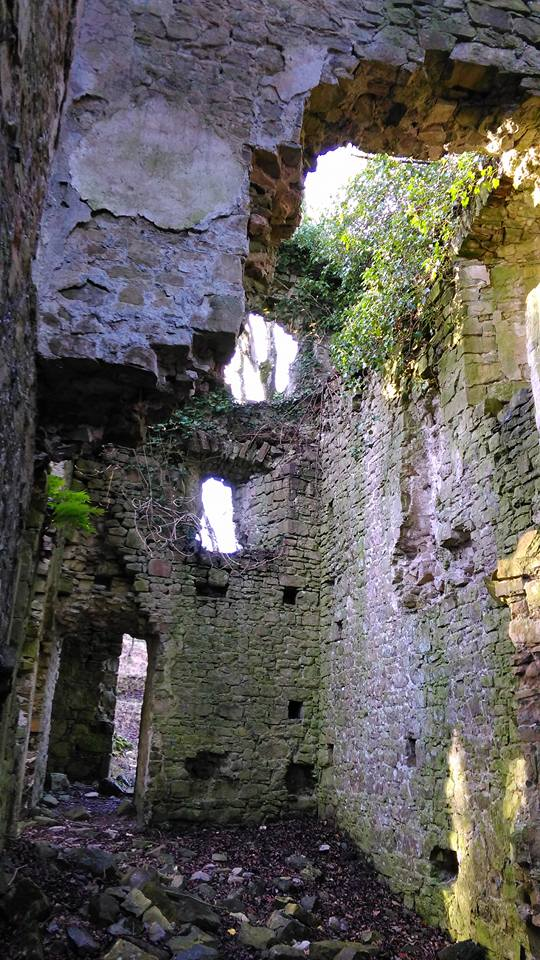
Inside East Orchard Castle

== Literature ==
- Clark, G.T. (1869). "East Orchard Manor House". Archaeologia Cambrensis. 24: 63–78.
- Stan Awbery (1959). The Story of St. Athan and Aberthaw.
