= East Camp =

Coordinates: 51.412°N 3.415°W

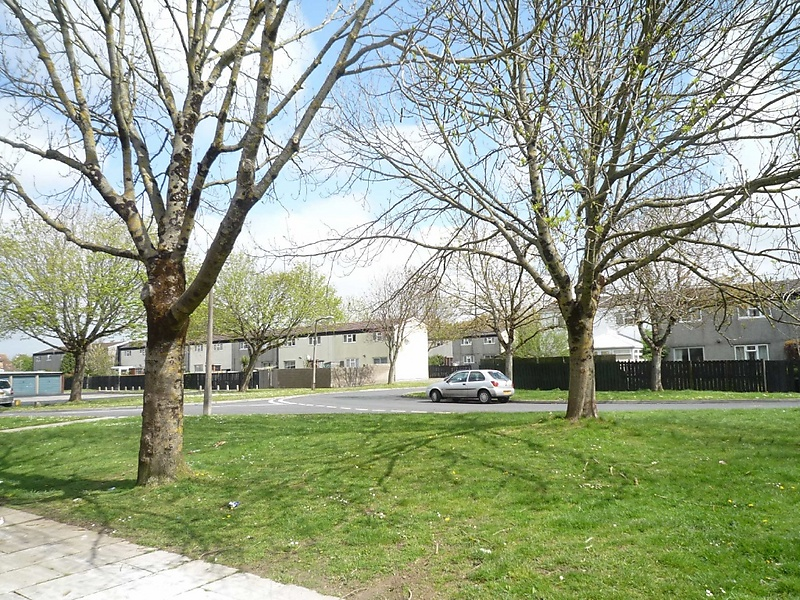
- Mallory Close, East Camp

- Location within the Vale of Glamorgan
- Principal area: Vale of Glamorgan
- Preserved county: South Glamorgan
- Country: Wales
- Sovereign state: United Kingdom
- Post town: Barry
- Postcode district: CF62
- Dialling code: 01446
- Police: South Wales
- Fire: South Wales
- Ambulance: Welsh
- UK Parliament: Vale of Glamorgan
- Senedd Cymru – Welsh Parliament: Vale of Glamorgan

East Camp is an Ex-MOD housing estate opposite the MOD St Athan main east entrance within St Athan. The housing estate sits between the village of St Athan and Flemingston but does not constitute a village itself. It falls under the Flemingston & Eglwys Brewis electoral ward.

Due to it being Ex-MOD property there are some particular arrangements regarding build and service supply to the properties. The Sewage is handled by Kelda Water Services (Defence) Limited and fresh water, management of the private parking, street lighting and areas of play is handled by a society called the East Vale Residents Co. Ltd. who outsource to Cadarn, the parent group of Newydd Housing Association.

East Camp houses a Food Bank.

The St Athan Golf Club is to the rear (east) of East Camp, next to a disused running track.

1st St Athan Scout Group meet at East Camp, mainly at The Gathering Place.

== History ==
In World War II East Camp maintenance units were bomb targets because of the RAF activity there. The particular fresh water arrangement to site was also to prevent troops/staff being poisoned as all water was treated on the RAF site.

The buildings are concrete prefabrications said to be built for the 1958 British Empire and Commonwealth Games and later used for the R.A.F. families. Due to their similar design and the way the buildings lock together like blocks, the estate was also nicknamed "Legoland". It also has the nickname Explorers Estate as each of the streets, Scott Close, Shackleton Close, Livingstone Way, Drake Close, Clive Road and Mallory Close were named after discoverers, Flemingston Road being a pre-existing road.

The local Spar used to be Naafi (Navy, Army, Air Force, Institutes) as part of the R.A.F.'s stores but later opened to the public as a Spar. This is now closed.

28 April 2016 a Food Bank opened on East Camp's The Gathering Place.

== Transport ==
Taxi and Greenlinks operate to East Camp but the only public transport is a bus service.

There is a bridle path to the north of East Camp, near Flemingston.

== Landmarks ==
The Gathering Place Methodist Church is on the corner of the northern Flemingston Road entrance to East Camp. The Gathering Place is also a community centre.
