= The Herberts =

Coordinates: 51.438136°N 3.44038°W

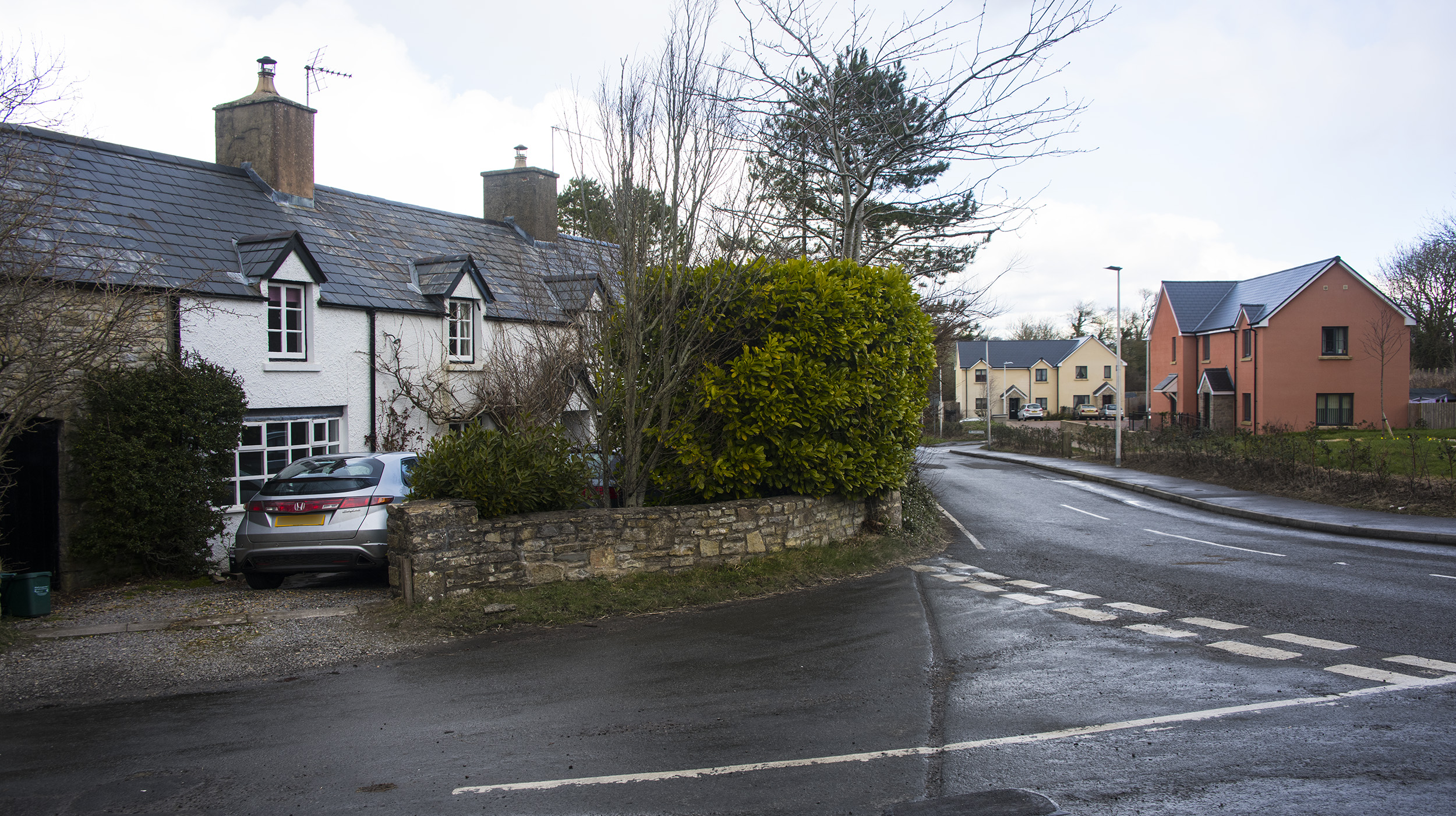
- The Herberts (2015)

- Location within the Vale of Glamorgan
- Principal area: Vale of Glamorgan
- Preserved county: South Glamorgan
- Country: Wales
- Sovereign state: United Kingdom
- Postcode district: CF
- Police: South Wales
- Fire: South Wales
- Ambulance: Welsh
- UK Parliament: Vale of Glamorgan
- Senedd Cymru – Welsh Parliament: Vale of Glamorgan

The Herberts is a hamlet in the Vale of Glamorgan, Wales. It is located immediately to the north of the village of St. Mary Church and southwest of Llandough, 2.2 miles by road southwest of the market town centre of Cowbridge along St Athan Road. The River Thaw flows through The Herberts.

== Landmarks ==
The fortified manor house, Old Beaupre Castle, is located to the northeast. Parwg Well and the Howe Mill also lie just to the northeast

The old garage in the main street was used as a location for the television series, Cowbois ac Injans.

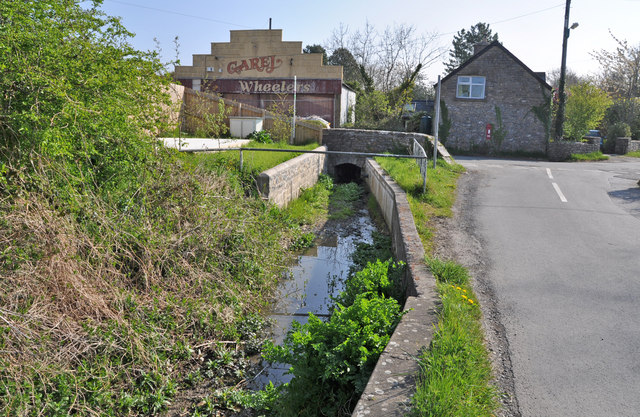
Roadside ditch at the Herberts
