= Nicholas Carlisle =

English antiquary and librarian

Sir Nicholas Carlisle, (1771 – 27 August 1847) was an English antiquary and librarian. In 1806, he became a candidate for the office of Secretary to the Society of Antiquaries, which he obtained the following year. In 1812, he became an Assistant Librarian of the Royal Library; he went on to accompany that collection to the British Museum, which he attended two days each week. He wrote several topographical dictionaries of England, Ireland, Wales and Scotland. He also wrote an historical account of Charitable Commissioners, and of Foreign Orders of Knighthood.

Carlisle traced his descent from John Carlisle (d. 1670), of Witton-le-Wear. He was the son of Thomas Carlisle. His father married, first, Elizabeth Hutchinson; they had at least one child, a son, the surgeon, Anthony Carlisle. Thomas married secondly Susanna Skottowe, who was Nicholas' mother. Nicholas was born in York, where he was baptized in the St Mary Bishophill Junior, York on 8 February 1771. He received his education from the Rev. James Lawson at West Witton. Carlisle entered the Bombay Marine, attaining the post of purser. He also went into private business and made a large sum of money.

In 1839, he was elected as a member of the American Philosophical Society. He was appointed Doctor of Civil Law in 1847.

== Select Bibliography ==
- A concise description of the endowed grammar schools in England and Wales 2 vols. (1818)
- A Topographical Dictionary of England (1808)
- An Index to the First Fifteen Volumes of Archaeologia; Or, Miscellaneous Tracts, Relating to Antiquity (1809)
- A Topographical Dictionary of Ireland (1819)
- A Topographical Dictionary of the Dominion of Wales (1811)
- A Topographical Dictionary of Scotland (1813)
- A concise account of the several foreign orders of knighthood : and other marks of honourable distinction (1839)
