= Barry Waterfront =

- District
- View of The Waterfront

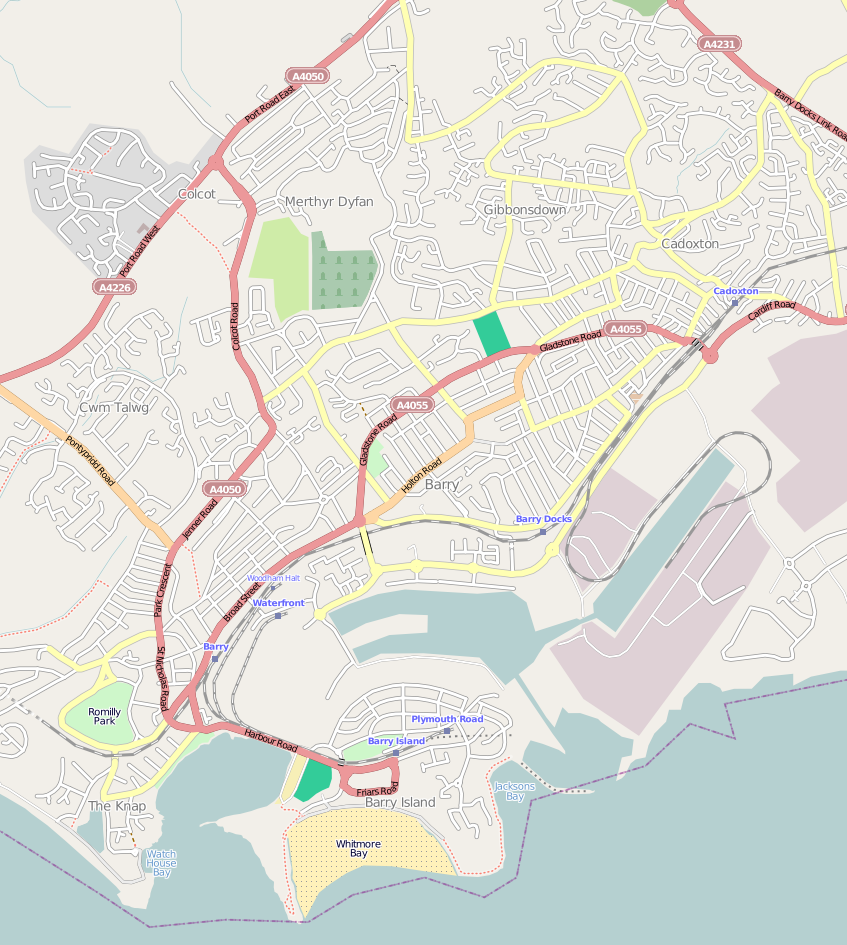
- Location in Barry
- Coordinates: 51°24′5″N 3°16′17″W
- Country: United Kingdom
- Region: Wales
- County: Vale of Glamorgan
- Town: Barry
- Time zone: UTC+0 (GMT)

Barry Waterfront or Waterfront Barry, known locally as The Waterfront, is a retail park and neighbourhood of Barry, Vale of Glamorgan, Wales, built from redeveloped land from the old Barry Docks, to the southwest of the town centre and to the immediate west of Barry Dock Offices. It is accessed via the Gladstone Bridge from Broad Street, to the south of Barry Memorial Hall, and along the Ffordd-Y-Mileniwm road from the southeast, leading on from Cardiff Road approached via Palmerston.

== History ==
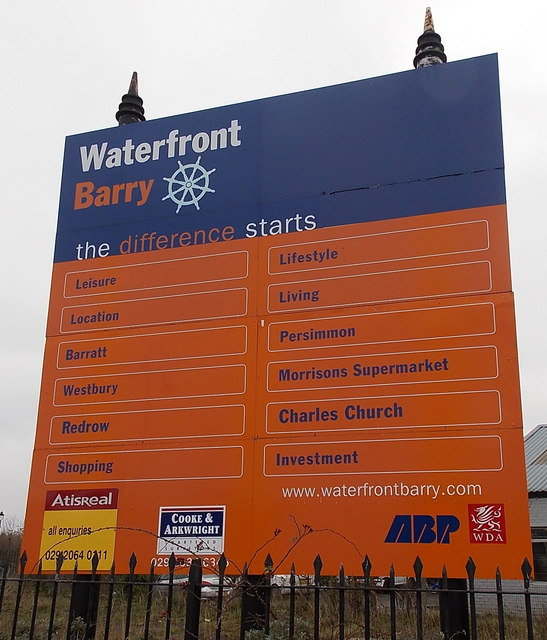
Barry Waterfront sign

Plans for redevelopment of the waterfront in Barry date back to 1988, during the period that Cardiff Bay was undergoing major redevelopment by the Cardiff Bay Development Corporation. Like the one further along the coast in Cardiff, the Barry Waterfront redevelopment scheme has been one of the largest to be undertaken in the UK. The Associated British Ports (ABP) and the Welsh Development Agency began undertaking a multimillion-pound land regeneration programme on 77 hectares (190 acres) of land next to the Number One Dock, working with the Barry Joint Initiative from 1991, and the Barry Waterfront Consortium was established to manage the regeneration scheme of the derelict area at the Number One Dock.

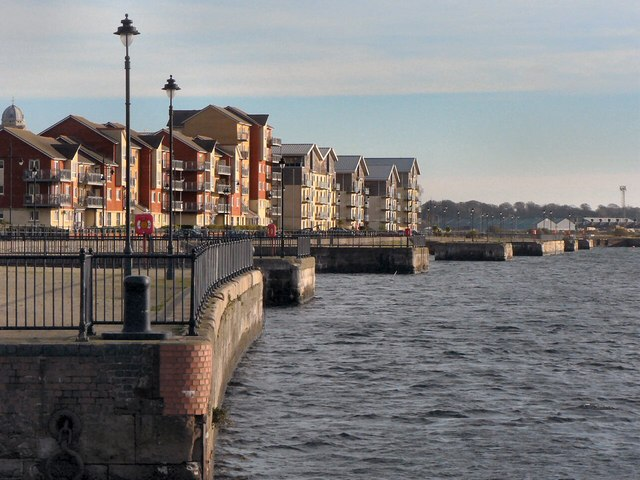
The David's Wharf apartments of Barry Waterfront

In 2001, Morrisons opened a new branch at the site, and a 55,000 sq ft non-food retail park adjacent to the site, hosting Focus DIY, Halfords, Argos, and a Kentucky Fried Chicken outlet, was completed in 2004. In 2002, Westbury Homes were given the green light to build new £12 million apartments at Barry Waterfront, to be named David's Wharf after David Davies, who established the Barry Docks. Byron Lewis, project manager, stated at the time of the fifth residential development at the site that "The new development will build on the success of Waterfront Barry as a top quality site for economic and community growth". At the same time it was announced that there were plans to remove the Vopak chemical tanks from the Barry Island side of the docks.

In 2004, Cooke & Arkwright and Chesterton, acting on behalf of Associated British Ports and the Welsh Development Agency sold land at Holton Reach in the western part of the area to housing developer Redrow plc, who were given the go ahead to build a new estate at Holton Reach with 84 private houses and 29 "affordable homes", a doctor's surgery, and a community centre incorporating a church.

In October 2007, a new £350 million project was announced to build 400 new homes and to develop a 300,000 square foot area for commercial and leisure use, led by a consortium of Taylor Wimpey, Persimmon Homes and Barratt Homes. In December 2007 it was announced that there were plans to build an offshore windfarm at the Barry and Cardiff waterfronts. By 2008, 782 houses had been approved on the site, and 686 houses completed, in addition to 5,110 m^{2} (55,000 sq ft) of retail park, a health centre and pharmacy, and a Morrisons supermarket.

In July 2011, the Vale of Glamorgan Council approved plans for the developmental phase of the site, which will include the redevelopment of West Pond/South Quay, East Quay and Arno Quay areas of the old docks. In March 2012, a £230 million project to include "private and affordable housing, cafes, restaurants, play areas and public spaces" was granted planning permission. However, in July 2012, it was found that contamination levels on the site exceeded those which had been initially anticipated, and two years later the project was still stalled. A further delay of 12 months is expected. A waterfront café quarter is to be established as well as further expansion of the residential area to some 2,000 houses.

== Culture ==
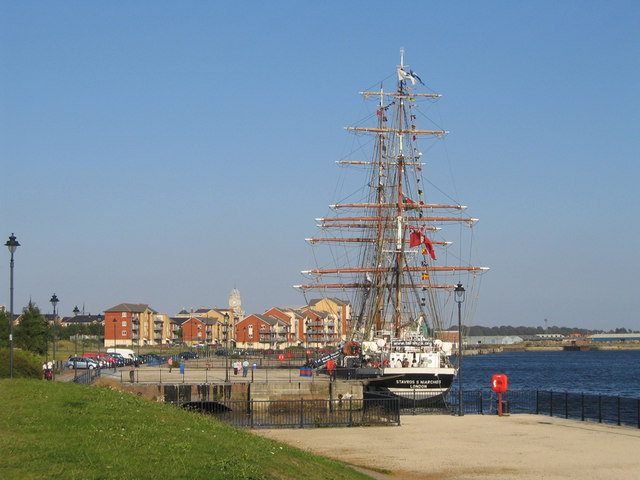
Tall Ship at the Barry Waterfront

The Barry Waterfront Festival is an annual event held in September. Historically, the Tall Ships Festival has been part of the Barry Waterfront Festival, although construction issues at the waterfront effected the Tall Ships event in 2013. The Prince William and Tenacious tallships were a significant local attraction on the waterfront.

== Features ==
It contains a Morrisons supermarket, a KFC, Halfords, Pets at Home, Argos, B&M, Burger King, Starbucks, Costa Coffee, the Waterfront Medical Practice, Barry Waterfront Centre (also hosting Charles Church), a housing estate, and a branch of the Premier Inn. To the south of the retail park are modern apartments along the waterfront, known as David's Wharf, along Y Rhodfa.

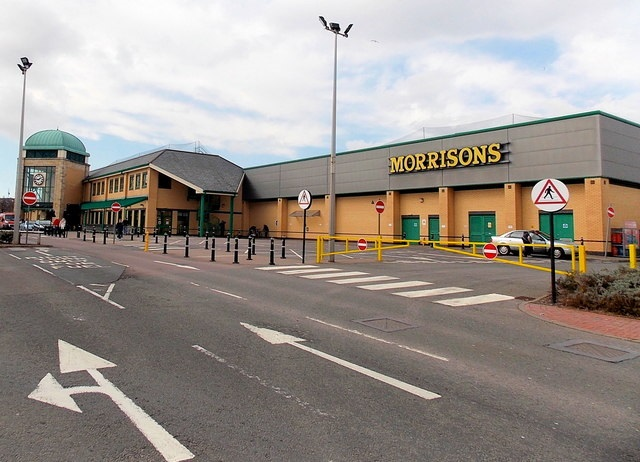
Morrisons superstore

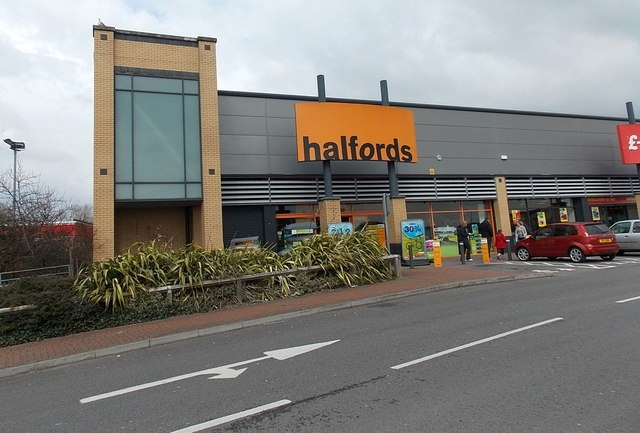
Halfords

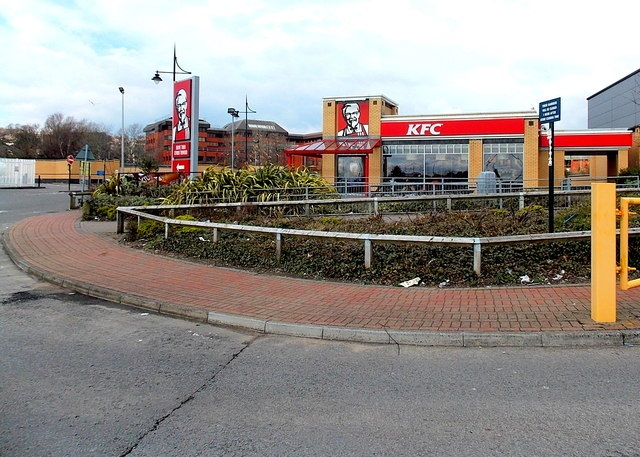
KFC
