= Great Brynhill =

Coordinates: 51.4275°N 3.282222°W

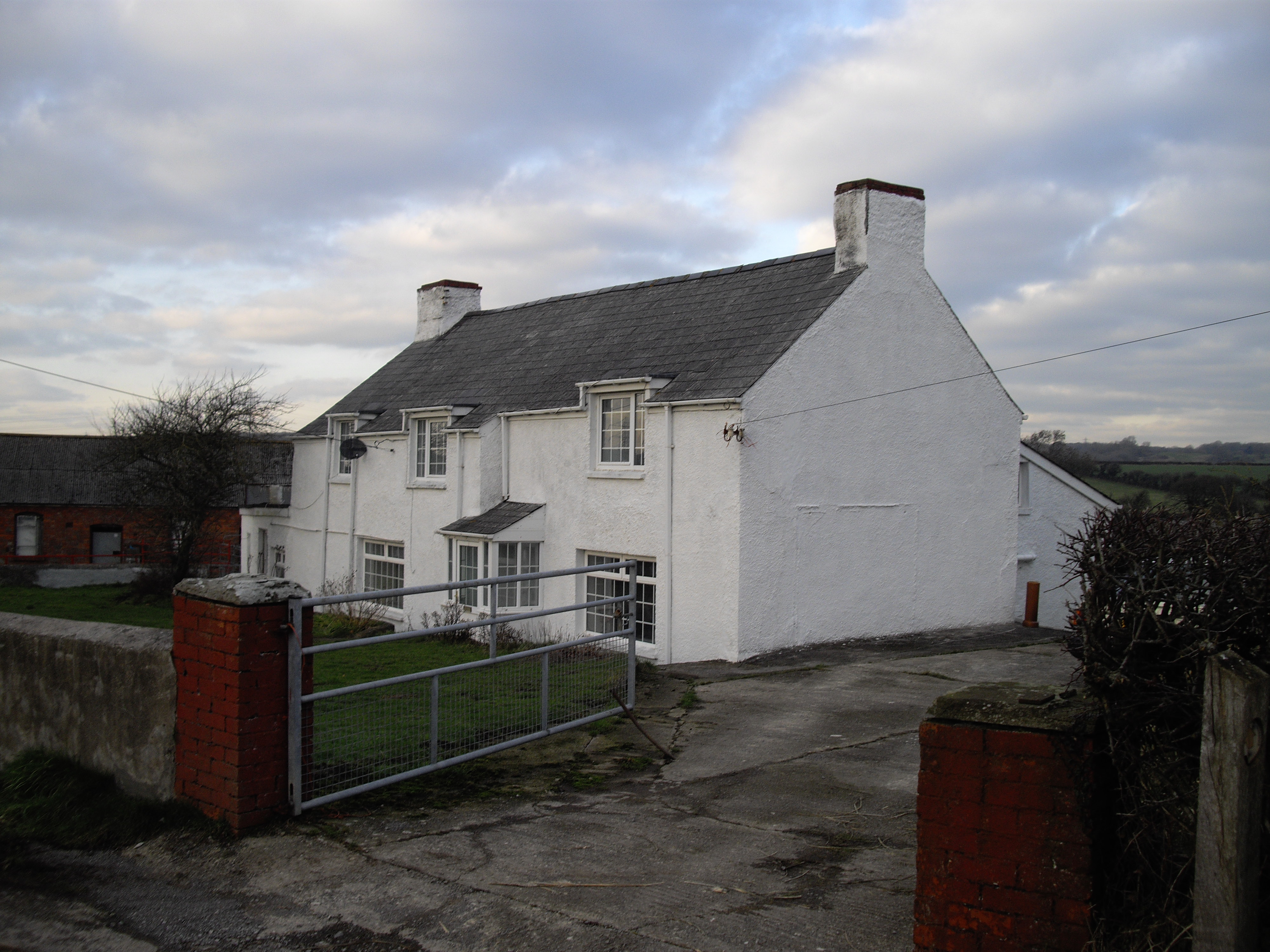
- Great Brynhill Farmhouse

- Location within the Vale of Glamorgan
- Principal area: Vale of Glamorgan
- Preserved county: South Glamorgan
- Country: Wales
- Sovereign state: United Kingdom
- Postcode district: CF
- Police: South Wales
- Fire: South Wales
- Ambulance: Welsh
- UK Parliament: Vale of Glamorgan
- Senedd Cymru – Welsh Parliament: Vale of Glamorgan

Great Brynhill is a small hamlet and farm in the Vale of Glamorgan in south Wales. It consists little more than a few farms including the Little Brynhill Farm and Thorn Falcon Farm (Little Brynhill) and the Great Brynhill Farm. It is located in the historical parish of Merthyr Dyfan and near Colcot now northern districts of the town of Barry. It is accessed via a lane from Port Road (the A4050 road) but can also be accessed from Dyffryn along the lane to the New Wallace Farm and Goldsland which lie just to the northeast.

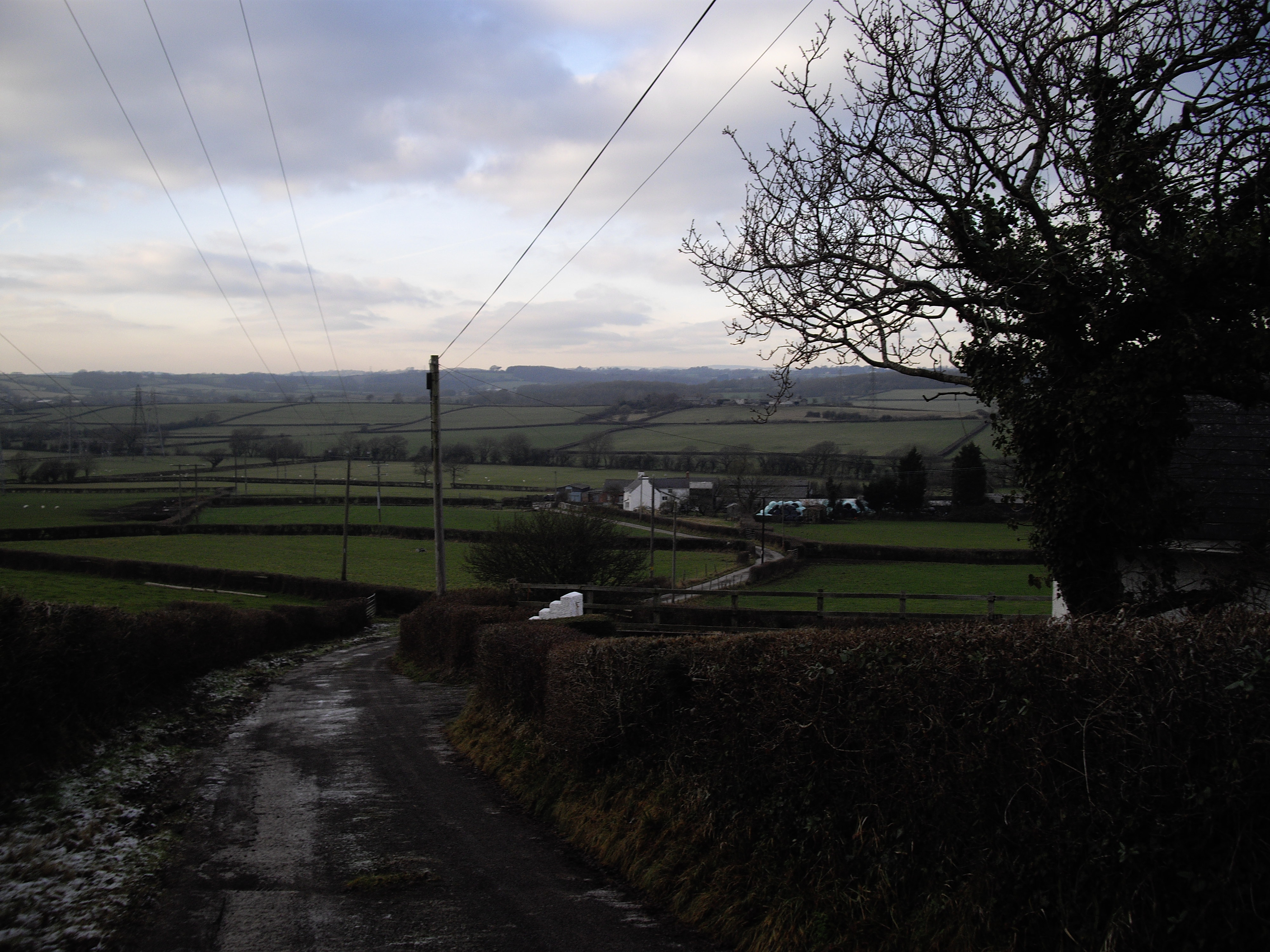
Great Brynhill Lane, the larger farm in the distance at the foot of the "Brynhill"

"Bryn" means "hill" in Welsh, so the name "Brynhill" appears to literally mean "hill hill". However, early forms of the name suggest that it was formerly "Brind Hill" in Middle English, possibly meaning "burned hill", which was then influenced by the Welsh word "bryn". The Little Brynhill Farm is owned by the Tanner family who are notable milk suppliers in Barry under the company name "W. A. Tanner & Son". One of the farms sold off some of their land along with neighbouring Highlight Farm when Brynhill Golf Club was formed in 1921. According to the Barry & District News, Thorn Falcon Farm sold for £400,000 on 25 November 2005.
