= Barry Castle =

Ruins in the Vale of Glamorgan, Wales

- Castell y Barri (Welsh)
- Barry, Wales
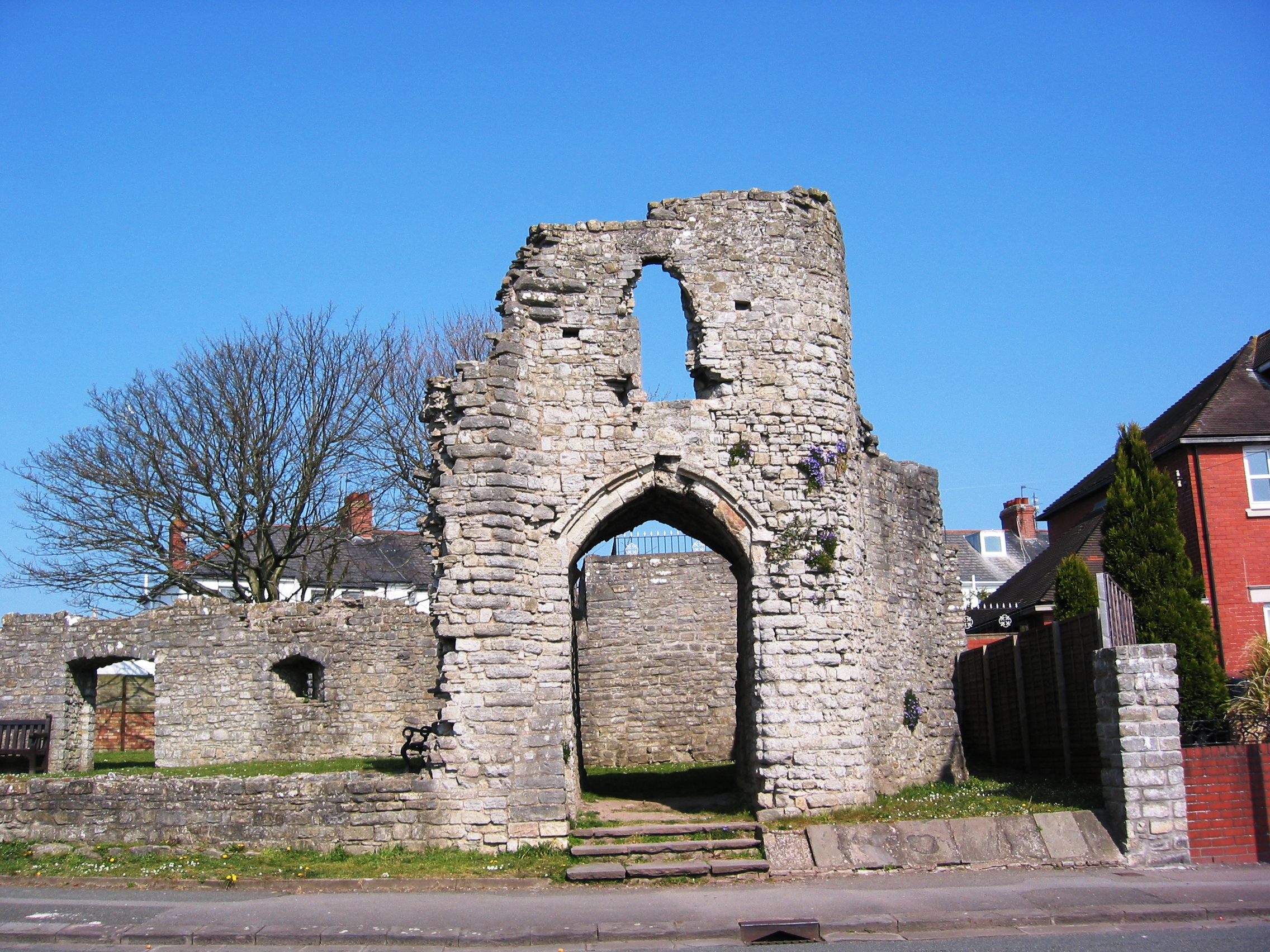
- Barry Castle

Site information
- Owner: Cadw
- Open to the public: yes
- Condition: Ruinous

Location
- Shown within Vale of Glamorgan
- Location within Wales
- Coordinates: 51°23′48″N 3°17′38″W

Barry Castle (Welsh: Castell y Barri) is a small Grade II* listed ruined two-storey gatehouse with the adjacent walls of a hall in the Romilly district of Barry, Vale of Glamorgan in south Wales.

== History ==
The castle was established as a wooden ringwall in the 12th century by the Barry family. Its name is derived from the nearby island where the pre-Norman chapel of St. Barruca was founded. The castle played a significant role in the local landscape, and its construction was attributed to the knight William de Barry.

Throughout the subsequent centuries, Barry Castle underwent various transformations and expansions. In the late 13th century, stone buildings were erected within the original castle, marking a transition from its earlier wooden structure. The castle's evolution continued under the ownership of John de Barry, who oversaw repairs and extensions, including the construction of a southern great hall and a distinctive gatehouse.

The castle faced challenges and conflicts over the years. It endured an attack and severe damage during the revolt of Llywelyn Bren against King Edward II in 1316. Despite setbacks, the castle was repaired and extended, contributing to its continued prominence in the region.

== Architecture ==
The castle originally consisted of wooden and earth fortifications, with a diameter of approximately 35 meters and a protective ditch. In the late 13th century, stone structures were added, including rectangular buildings on the north-east and north-west corners. These structures were connected by defensive walls, enclosing a small courtyard between them.

During the 14th century, the castle underwent further expansion, incorporating a southern great hall connected to a gatehouse and a corner tower. The southern building housed a representative hall on its first floor, complete with a fireplace in the north wall. The entrance to this building led from the courtyard, with the possibility of direct access to the first floor via external wooden stairs.

The gatehouse, a prominent feature of Barry Castle, included a pointed portal with a portcullis, double doors, and a drawbridge. Above the gate passage, a small room possibly served as a chapel. The gatehouse's upper floor was linked to the adjacent hall building and featured a curving passage connecting to the defensive wall-walk.

== Current state ==
Today, Barry Castle stands as a Grade II* listed ruined structure. The castle's gatehouse, with its ogival portal and Gothic window, remains relatively well-preserved. Fragments of walls on the north and east sides, as well as an arrowslit, can still be observed. The castle site is open to the public.

== See also ==
- List of castles in Wales
- Castles in Great Britain and Ireland
