= Elvira Gwenllian Payne =

Elvira Gwenllian (Gwen) Payne (née Hinds) (1917 - 2007) was a politician and community activist who became Wales' first Black female councillor and remained involved in local politics until her death in 2007. Known as Gwen, she was the daughter of Leonard Hinds and Gwenllian Hinds (née Lloyd) and the sister of John Darwin Hinds, who was himself Wales' first Black, and first Muslim Councillor.

== Early life ==
Gwen was born in Morgan Street, Barry on the 28th March 1917. Gwen was the eldest of two children. Her father was a merchant seaman from Barbados, who later became a coal miner and her mother was from Barry.

Gwen initially worked as a carer in London before working in a munitions factory in Pontypool and then as a school meals supervisor for Colcot school for many years. She married Colin Montgomery Payne in 1951 and they had three sons together before her husband's death in 1978.

Gwen survived cervical cancer in 1966 and died 5 April 2007 in Llandough Hospital. She is buried in Barry cemetery.

== Political career ==
Gwen was a member of the Labour party along with her brother John. She was elected to the Vale of Glamorgan Council in 1972. She served as the Vale of Glamorgan mayoress for her brother between 1974 and 1976 and became Barry Town Council deputy mayor in 1979.

== Community work ==
As well as her political work, Gwen was a founder secretary and organiser of Guide Dogs for the Blind and a founder member of Buttrills Community Centre. Gwen was also president of the Arthritis Care Committee for three years and involved in a range of local initiatives including the Good Street Neighbour's Organisation, Roundel House Day Centre, Tenovus Cancer Research and Barry Island Community Centre.

== Barry Community Hall campaign ==
After Gwen's death there was a campaign to name a new community hall after her which was launched in 2020.
