= Barry Council Office and Library =

Municipal Building in Barry, Wales

- Swyddfa a Llyfrgell y Cyngor Barri (Welsh)
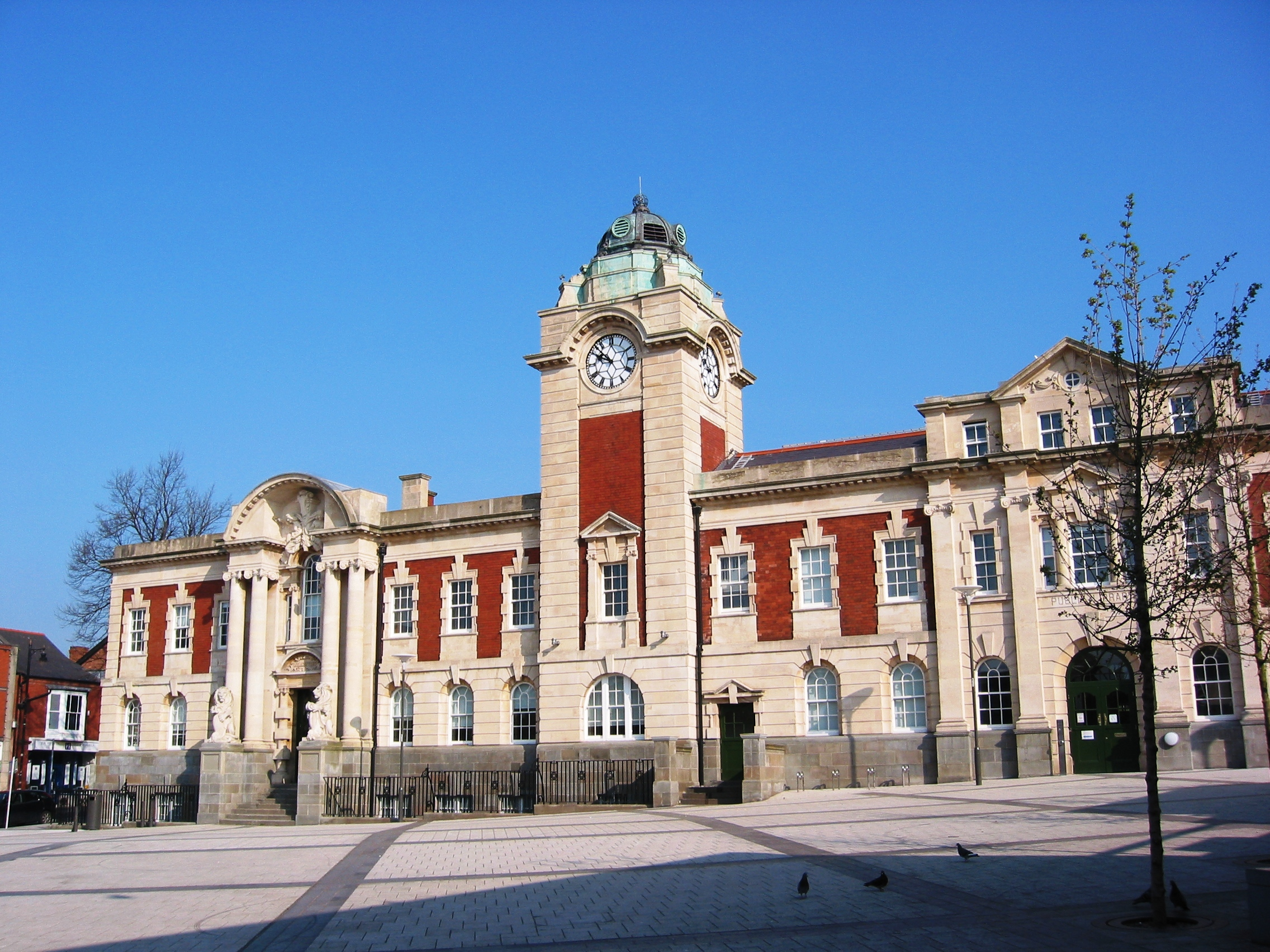
- Barry Town Hall with Library to the right

- Shown in Vale of Glamorgan
- 51.4067°N 3.2666°W
- Location: Barry

History
- Built: 1908

Site notes
- Architect(s): Charles E. Hutchinson and E. Harding Payne
- Architectural style: Edwardian Baroque style

Listed Building – Grade II
- Designated: 21 August 1979
- Reference no.: 13404

Barry Council Office and Library (Welsh: Swyddfa a Llyfrgell y Cyngor Barri) is a local government building and public library located in King Square, Barry, Wales. The building, which was once the meeting place of Barry Municipal Borough Council, is a Grade II listed building.

== History ==
The first lending library in Barry was opened in 1890, at 144 Holton Road. It later moved to a three-storey house on the Square, with the ground floor used as a reading room, the lending library on the second floor and caretaker's rooms on the top floor. Following the formation of Barry Urban District Council in 1895, civic leaders decided that this arrangement was inadequate and chose to procure a purpose-built combined council office and public library complex. The site they selected was the old Maes-y-cwm Quarry, which had been excavated in 1900.

In 1903 the council applied to the Andrew Carnegie Trust for a grant to establish a purpose-built public library. The trust awarded a grant of £8,000. Following a design competition, Charles E. Hutchinson and E. Harding Payne of London were selected to design the building in the Edwardian Baroque style. After the first stage of construction, the public library was officially opened by the Earl of Plymouth on 1 March 1906. Following a second stage of construction, the council office was officially opened by the chairman of the council, Mr W. J. Williams, on 22 April 1908. A further expansion to the rear of the new building was planned but never executed.

== Architecture ==
The design involved a broadly symmetrical frontage with fifteen bays facing King Square. The central section featured a round-headed window on the ground floor and a clock tower above. The left hand section, comprising the council office, featured a round-headed doorway on the ground floor flanked by paired full height Ionic order columns, a Venetian window on the first floor and an open segmental pediment containing a cartouche flanked by female figures above. The right hand section, comprising the public library, featured a round-headed doorway on the ground floor flanked by full height paired Ionic order pilasters, a square window flanked by two narrow windows on the first floor, four small square windows on the attic floor and a pediment above.

== Usage ==
The council office was established as the meeting place of Barry Urban District Council and, from 1939, of Barry Municipal Borough Council. It briefly continued to be the local seat of government after Vale of Glamorgan Borough Council was formed in 1974. The council then moved to new civic offices in Holton Road in 1981.

After the public library moved to temporary facilities at the town's leisure centre in 2001, a major refurbishment of the whole complex was carried out. The work, which included a new wing for the public library, was completed in time for an official opening by the Mayor of the Vale of Glamorgan, Nic Hodges, on 4 January 2007. The refurbishment of the complex cost £371,000, £124,000 more than had been budgeted, leading to requests for an inquiry in February 2008.
