= Cwm Talwg =

- District of Barry
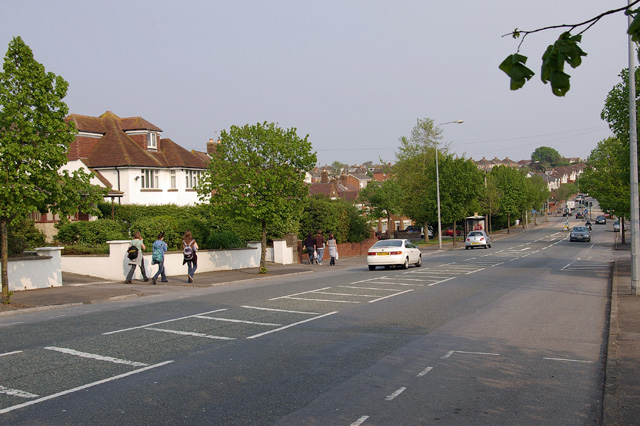
- Pontypridd Road. The estate is off to the left.

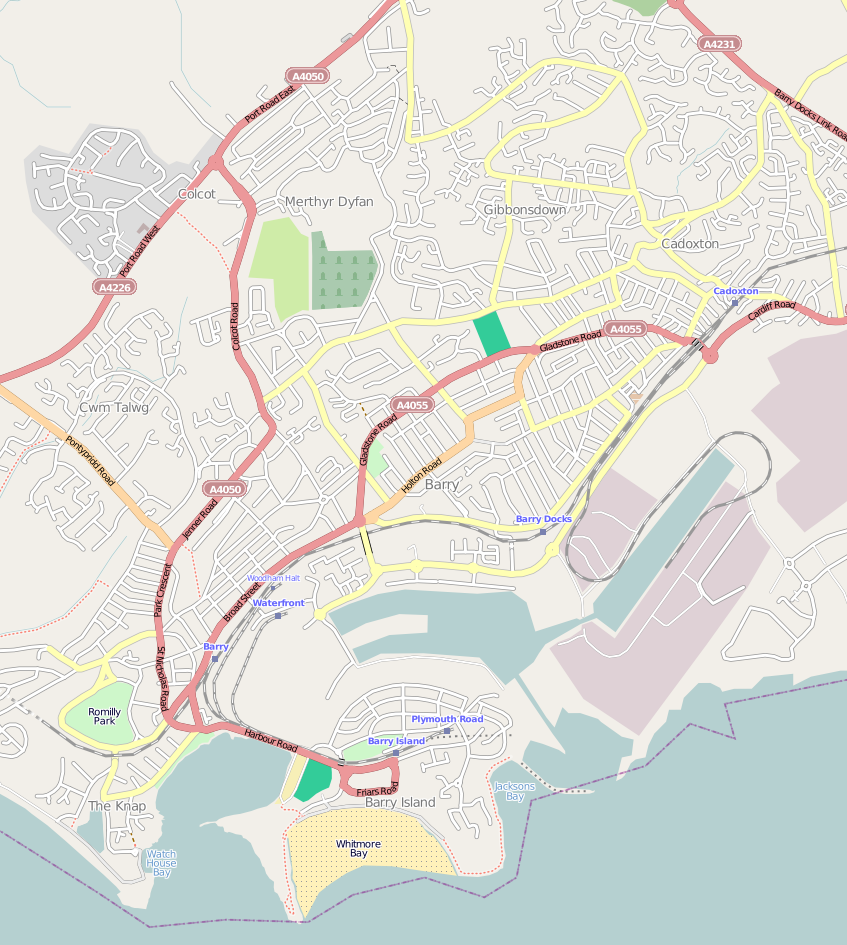
- Location in Barry
- Coordinates: 51°24′28″N 3°17′17″W
- Country: United Kingdom
- Region: Wales
- County: Vale of Glamorgan
- Town: Barry
- Time zone: UTC+0 (GMT)

Cwm Talwg is a north-western district and large housing estate complex within the town of Barry in the Vale of Glamorgan ten miles outside Cardiff in south Wales.

It is on the outskirts of the main town and links to Pontypridd Road and the A4050 road out of Barry. Prior to the housing development of Cwm Talwg, it was a pig farm; cows, pigs and sheep roamed freely. in 1978 the EC announced the "construction of 104 houses, 20 flats, 31 flats in sheltered accommodation with warden's bungalow and associated site works."

Cwm Talwg has two small forests which are maintained by woodland volunteers and have paths leading from Usk Way to Severn Avenue or Elan Close to Highlight Park. Community walks are often organised through the Cwm Talwg woods. Cwm Talwg contains All Saints' Church in Wales Primary School, a voluntary aided school, sponsored by the Church in Wales. It had 236 pupils aged 3–11 as of 2002. It 2002 opened a new nursery unit designed by Nigel Arnold and built by the Dineen Brothers.
