= Holton, Vale of Glamorgan =

Holton
- District of Barry
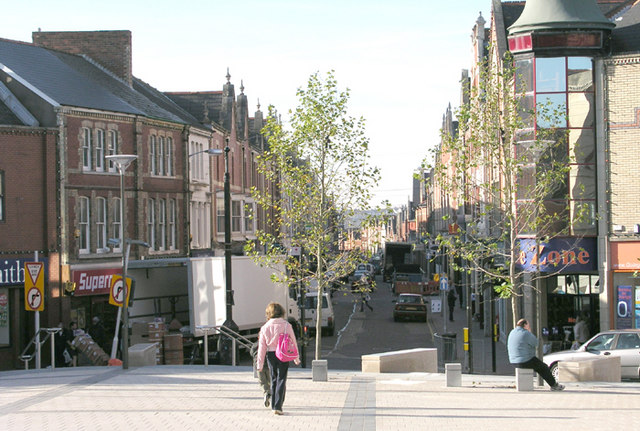
- Holton Road from King's Square

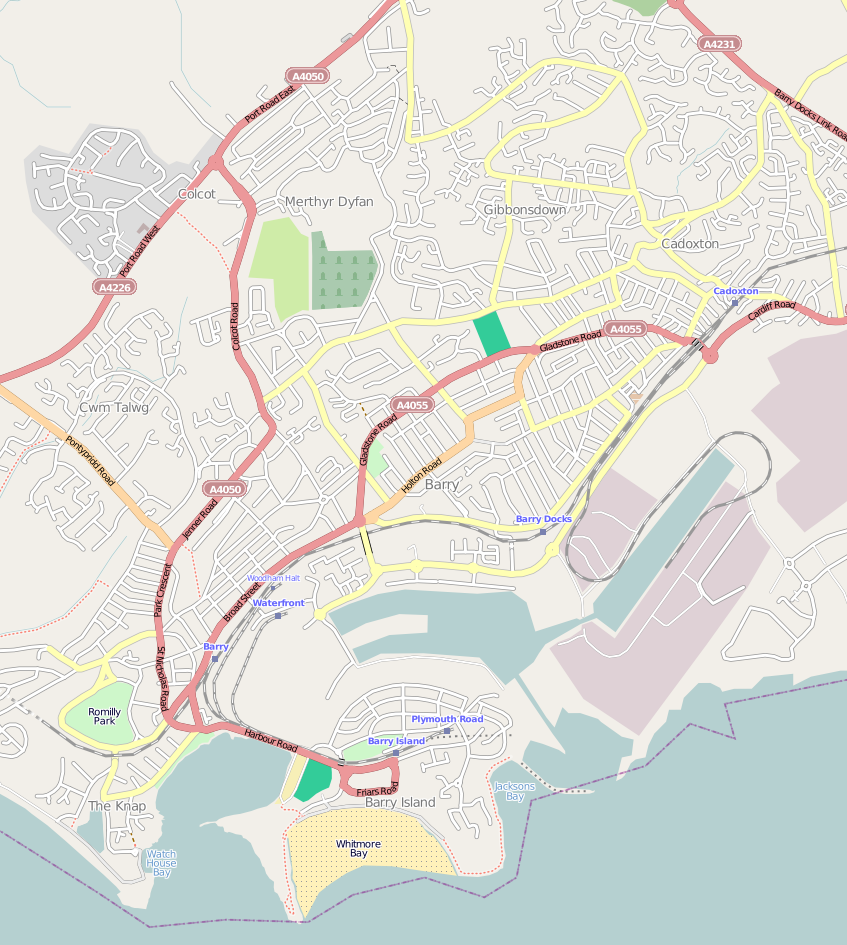
- Location in Barry
- Coordinates: 51°24′25.2″N 3°16′1.2″W
- Country: United Kingdom
- Region: Wales
- County: Vale of Glamorgan
- Town: Barry
- Time zone: UTC+0 (GMT)

Holton is a central district of Barry in the Vale of Glamorgan 9 miles outside Cardiff in south Wales. As the Central business district of Barry it is dominated by Barry shopping centre and Barry Town Library. It also has Holton Road School which is the biggest primary school in the vale and it was built in 1895.

Holton Road is a business area that has been an important commercial part of Barry since the 1890s.

== Education ==
Holton Primary School is located in the area.

== Gallery ==
Holton
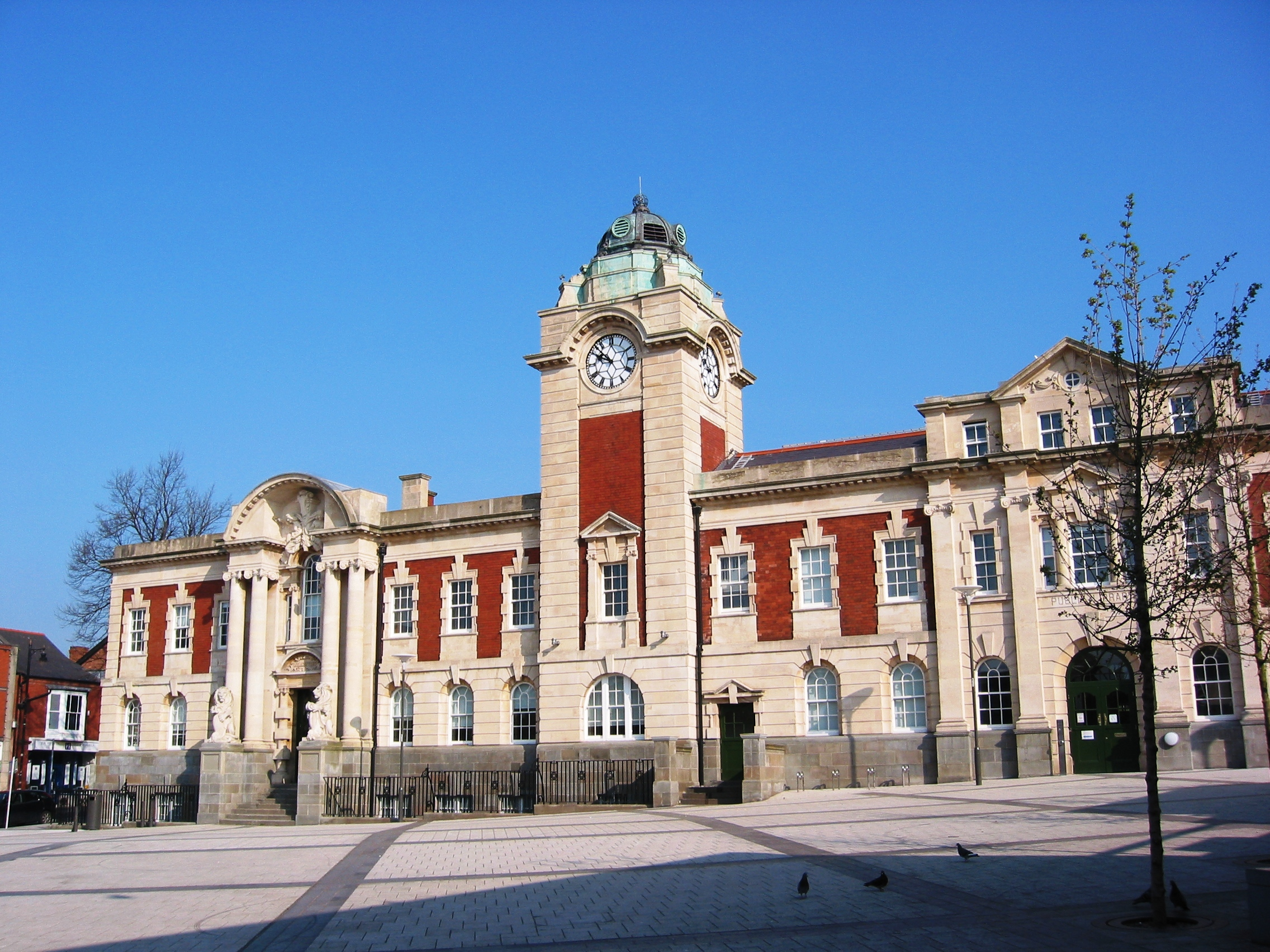
Barry Council Office

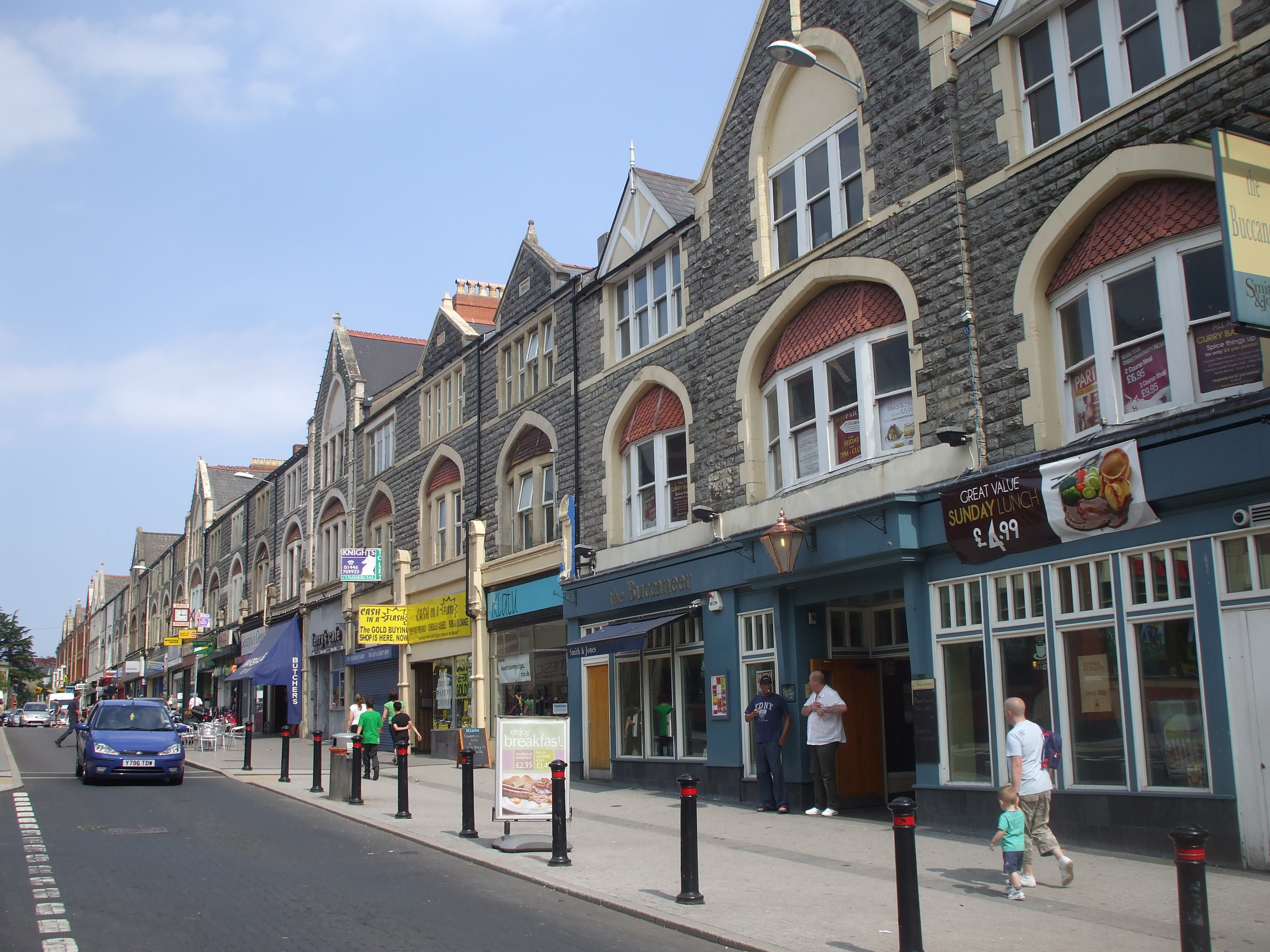
Holton Road
