= Colcot =

Colcot Colcoed
- District of Barry
- Colcot Primary School

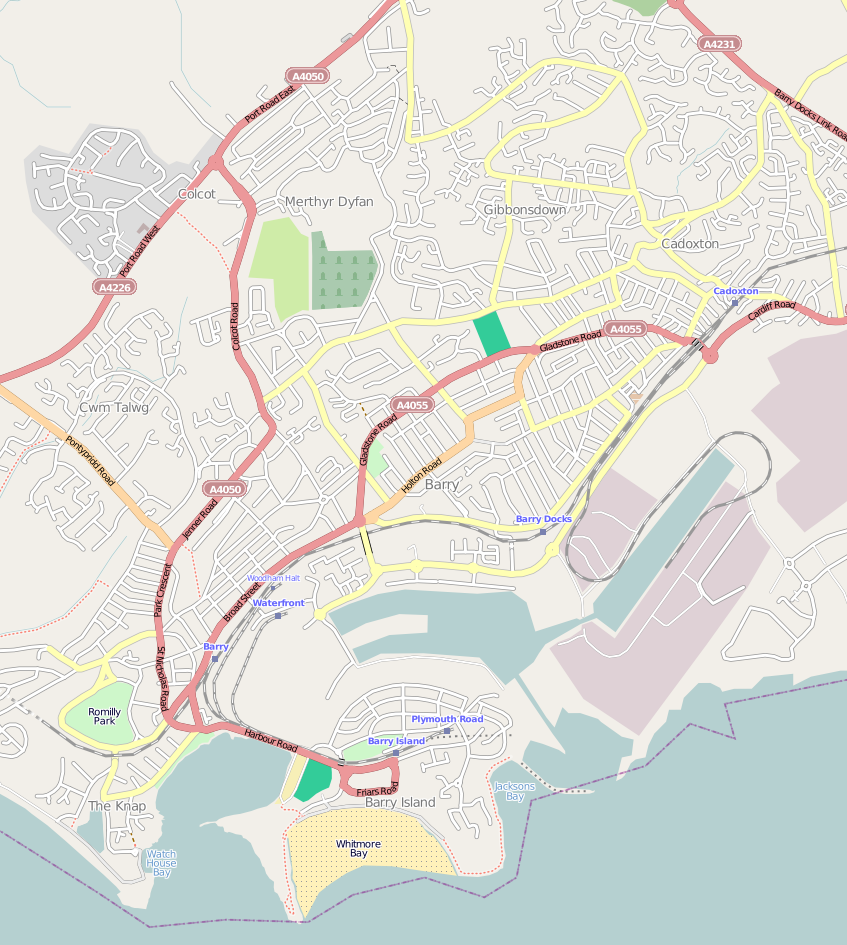
- Location in Barry
- Coordinates: 51°25′08″N 3°16′47″W
- Country: United Kingdom
- Region: Wales
- County: Vale of Glamorgan
- Town: Barry
- Time zone: UTC+0 (GMT)

Colcot (Welsh: Colcoed) is a northern district of Barry, Vale of Glamorgan, in the Dyfan ward of South Wales. Dyfan ward is situated in the north west of Barry and its most northern edge is on the green belt of the town. Port Road West runs through the ward and is the main route to Cardiff and Cardiff International Airport in Rhoose. Dyfan benefits from a sports centre and Buttrills recreation field and The Barry Hospital is located on Colcot Road. It also contains the Colcot Primary School, the Colcot Arms pub, the St David's Methodist Church, Coastlands Family Church, a fish and chip shop/Chinese takeaway, Barry Arts Centre and Merthyr Dyfan Cemetery.

== History ==
Nearby Merthyr Dyfan contained land belonging to a sub manor of Cadoxton. It contained two carucates and 240 customary acres of arable land, and there was a court or grange belonging to it in Colcot. Historically the farms Colcot Fawr and Colcot Ganol were in the vicinity, and a Collcot Farm is also mentioned in 1784. Colcot Fawr, once belonging to a John Love, was situated on the west side of Colcot Road, likely near where the Barry Comprehensive School now is. A prosperous farmer, he made his will in 1667 and died shortly afterwards in 1668; he is buried at Merthyr Dyfan church. The property was taken over by Thomas Love, who held Colcot Fawr until his death in 1683 when he is documented to have given £20 to his sisters Anne Love and Margaret Richard, and to his nephews and nieces, and a handsome number of his possessions to his brother Arnold. Anne is documented to have died in 1690, worth £41 and owed £29, 3 shillings.

Colcot Primary School was built in 1952. Many of the council houses in the area were built in the 1950s; a testament to the period they were built today is street names like Elizabeth Avenue, named after the then recently crowned Queen and Margaret Avenue, named after her sister Princess Margaret. Barry Hospital, on Colcot Road, was established in the mid-1990s.

== Crime ==
According to the Neighbourhood crime league table Dyfan ward has the lowest crime rate in Barry. The league table looks at the total crimes and crime rate for September 2014 that occurred in all neighbourhoods within 5 miles of Dyfan and orders them by lowest crime rate first.

Most notable crimes are the following; On 20 April 2006, an 18-year-old was left with a "cut eye, head injuries and a broken nose" after being punched and robbed of just a few pence by thugs at a bus stop near Colcot Cemetery. In April 2007, during the Easter holidays, vandals smashed 17 windows of Colcot Primary School, "trashed classrooms, chopped down trees and littered the playground with dozens of cans and broken beer bottles", prompting then headmaster Ieuan Richards to state, "The scale of the vandalism is just horrifying". A fire broke out at a house in Shelley Crescent in December 2007. Four years later on the same street, it was reported that a man had his nose broken in a fight. Colcot Community Centre on Keats Way allows residents affected by local crime to liaise with police officers.

== Landmarks ==
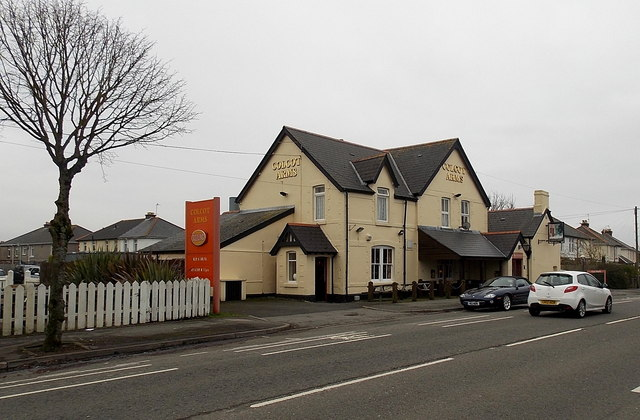
The Colcot Arms pub

The Colcot Arms pub is on Colcot Road, not far from the A4050 road. Scenes from the popular series Gavin & Stacey were shot in the pub. Along Winston Road, which passes from Colcot Road (near the pub) to Merthyr Dyfan Road, contains a number of shops. At the Colcot Road end there is the St David's Methodist Church, a Spar market, a fish and chip shop/Chinese takeaway, a hair salon, and Barry Arts Centre, and further down the road is Winston Square. It once contained several small shops, but these were later closed and boarded up, causing problems in the area with vandalism. From the 1990s there was a movement to redevelop the square with new shops which were due to open in November 1999, but in 2002 it was announced that local pressure was still mounting to build new shops to breathe new life into the community. After six years of "legal wrangling and negotiations over leases and other matters" and numerous acts of vandalism, in October 2005 the dilapidated flats on the square were finally demolished and a new £250,000 development with a general store, chemist shop, and a take-away was built.

Sports facilities include the Colcot Sports Centre and playing fields, and Colcot Sports Hall. Activities in these facilities include: weight training, football, basketball, badminton, hockey, rugby union, cricket, and rock climbing with a climbing wall. Colcot Sports Centre hosts an annual "mini-hockey festival", featuring mixed under-11 teams from Barry Island, Romilly, Palmerston, St Helen's of Barry, Llancarfan, Pendoylan, and Westbourne (Penarth).

Near the Colcot Road/A4050 (Port Road) roundabout is the entrance to Brynhill Golf Club, to the west of the hamlet of Great Brynhill. The 18-hole, 5947 yard golf course was established in 1921.

== Notable people ==
- Andrew Selby (born 1988), boxer
- Lee Selby (born 1987), boxer
