= John Darwin Hinds =

Former Wales politician (1922–1981)

Mayor of Vale of Glamorgan
- In office 1975–Unknown

Personal details
- Born: December 28, 1922 Maerdy, Wales
- Died: 15 March 1981
- Party: Labour
- Occupation: Politician, community activist

John Darwin Hinds (28 December 1922 - 15 March 1981) was a politician who became Wales' first Black and first Muslim councillor in 1958 and later, in 1975 became Wales's first Black mayor. His older sister, Elvira Gwenllian Payne (known as Gwen), was Wales' first Black female councillor.

== Early life ==
Hinds was born in Maerdy, to Leonard Hinds, a former merchant seaman, and Gwenllian Hinds (née Lloyd). He grew up on Morgan Street in Barry. He was one of six children and the younger brother of Elvira Gwenllian Payne, Wales' first Black female councillor. His mother was born in Barry and his father was originally from Barbados. His father earned the Mercantile Marine War Medal in 1919 and after the war became a coal miner in Maerdy.

After leaving school, Hinds initially worked in the coal mines at Bargoed before getting an opportunity to work in the Colonial Office in London. It was whilst working at the Colonial Office that Hinds became interested in politics.

== Political career and community work ==
Hinds returned to Wales and converted to Islam following a near death experience from contracting tuberculosis. It was around the same time that Hinds joined the Labour party and began working on local social issues.

Hinds was elected to Barry Town Council in 1958. He was Wales' first Muslim councillor and Wales' first Black councillor. He was a fluent Welsh speaker and at the time, only one of only three Welsh-speaking councillors.

Later in 1975, he became Wales' first Black mayor, becoming mayor for the Vale of Glamorgan Council. His sister, Gwen, served as his mayoress and he supported Gwen in founding the Buttrills Community centre. He advocated for the establishment of a local branch of the Guide Dogs for the Blind association and worked to end housing insecurity.
