= Barry, Vale of Glamorgan =

Town in the Vale of Glamorgan, Wales

Barry: Welsh: Y Barri
- Town
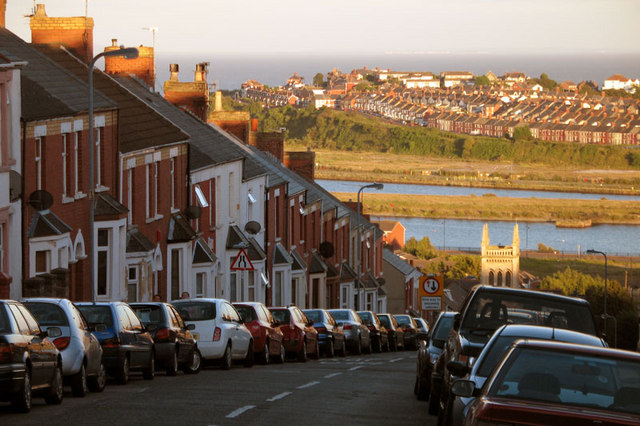
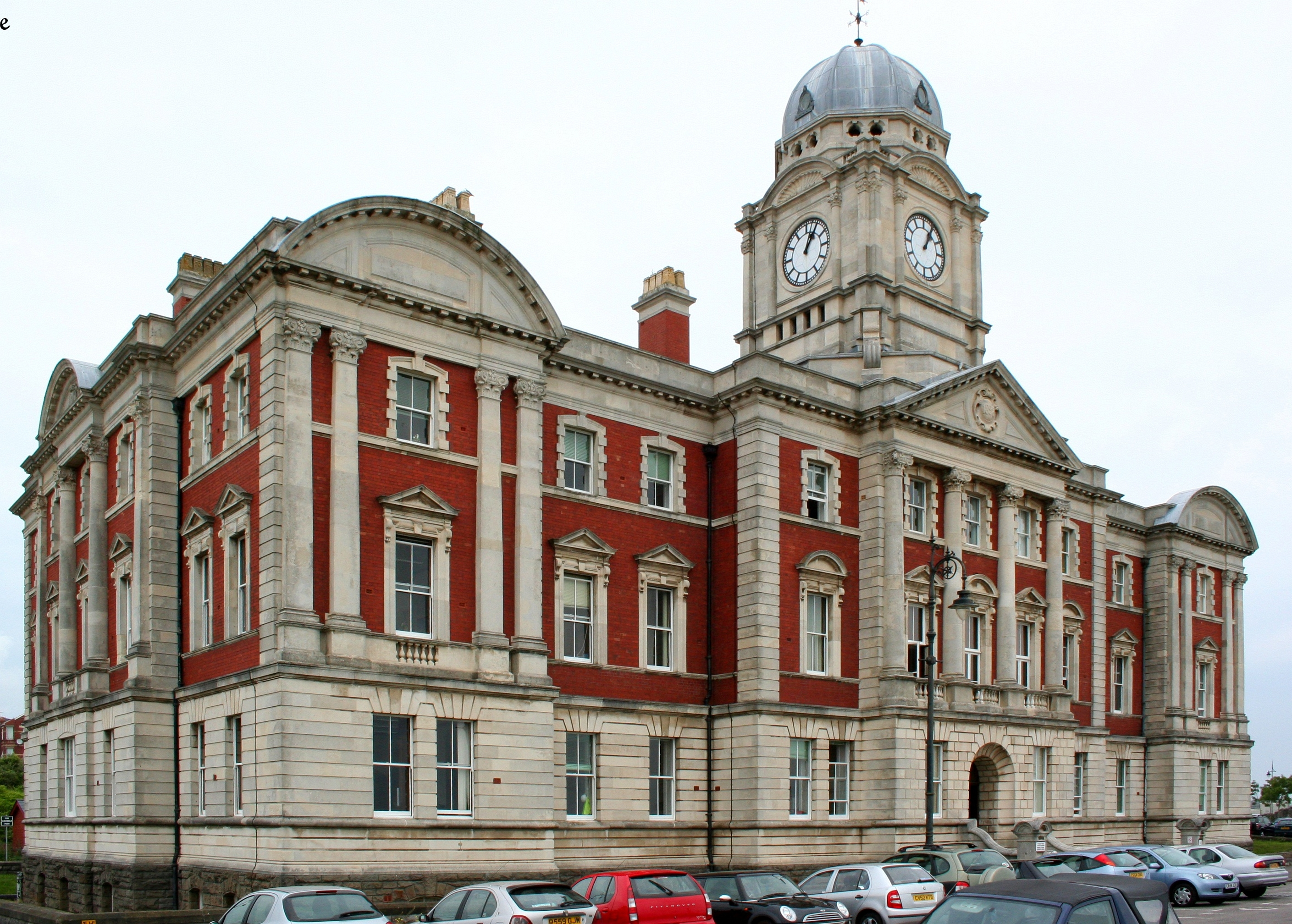
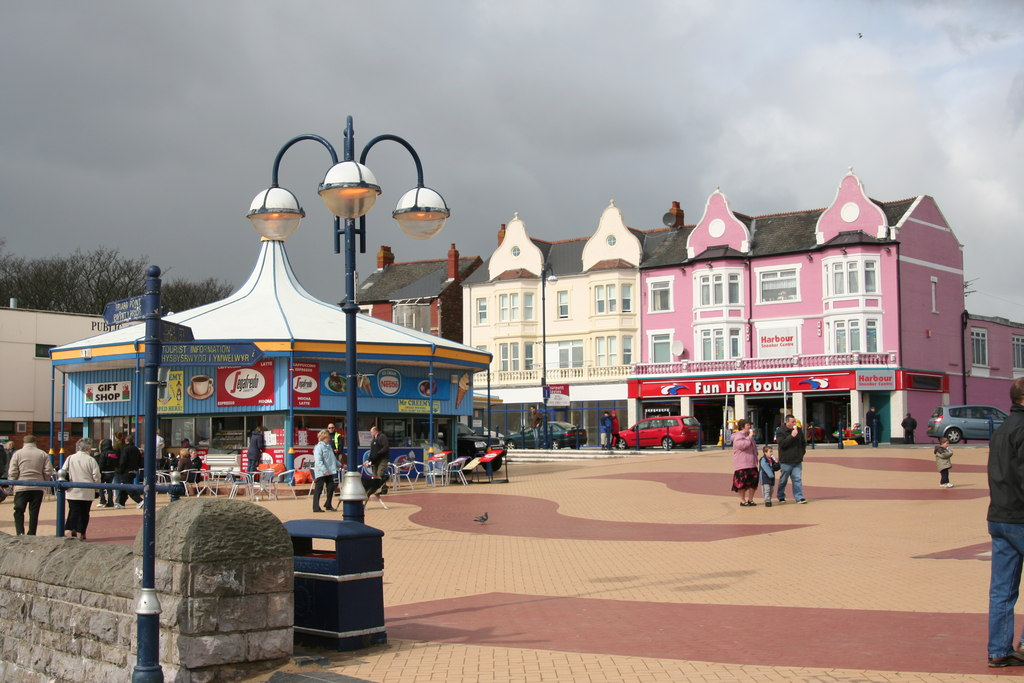
- From the top, Trinity street (Filming location of Gavin and Stacey), Dock Offices, Barry Island

- Location within the Vale of Glamorgan
- Population: 56,605 (2021)
- OS grid reference: ST119682
  - Cardiff: 9.9 miles (15.9 km)
  - London: 164.1 miles (264.1 km)
- Community: Barry
- Principal area: Vale of Glamorgan
- Preserved county: South Glamorgan
- Country: Wales
- Sovereign state: United Kingdom
- Post town: BARRY
- Postcode district: CF62–63
- Dialling code: 01446
- Police: South Wales
- Fire: South Wales
- Ambulance: Welsh
- UK Parliament: Vale of Glamorgan
- Senedd Cymru – Welsh Parliament: Pen-y-bont Bro Morgannwg
- List of places UK Wales Vale of Glamorgan 51.405°N 3.270°W Map of the community

Barry (/ˈbæri/; Welsh: Y Barri; pronounced [ə ˈbari]) is a coastal town and community in the Vale of Glamorgan, Wales. It is on the north coast of the Bristol Channel approximately 9 miles (14 km) south-southwest of Cardiff. Barry is a seaside resort, with attractions including several beaches and the resurrected Barry Island Pleasure Park. According to the 2021 census, the population of Barry was 56,605.

The town of Barry has absorbed its larger neighbouring villages of Cadoxton and Barry Island. It grew significantly from the 1880s with the development of Barry Docks, which, in 1913, was the largest coal port in the world.

== Etymology ==
The origin of the town's name is disputed. It may derive from the sixth-century Saint Baruc who was buried on Barry Island where a ruined chapel was dedicated to him. Alternatively, the name may derive from Welsh bar, meaning "hill, summit". The name in Welsh Y Barri includes the definite article.

== History ==
=== Early history ===
The area now occupied by Barry has seen human activity in many periods of history. Mesolithic or Middle Stone Age microlith flint tools have been found at Friars Point on Barry Island and near Wenvoe and Neolithic or New Stone Age polished stone axe-heads were discovered in St. Andrews Major. A cinerary urn (pottery urn buried with cremation ashes) was found on Barry Island during excavations of Bronze Age barrows and two more were found in a barrow at Cold Knap Point. A large defended enclosure or Iron Age promontory hillfort was located at the Bulwarks at Porthkerry and there was evidence of the existence of an early Iron Age farmstead during construction of Barry College off Colcot Road.

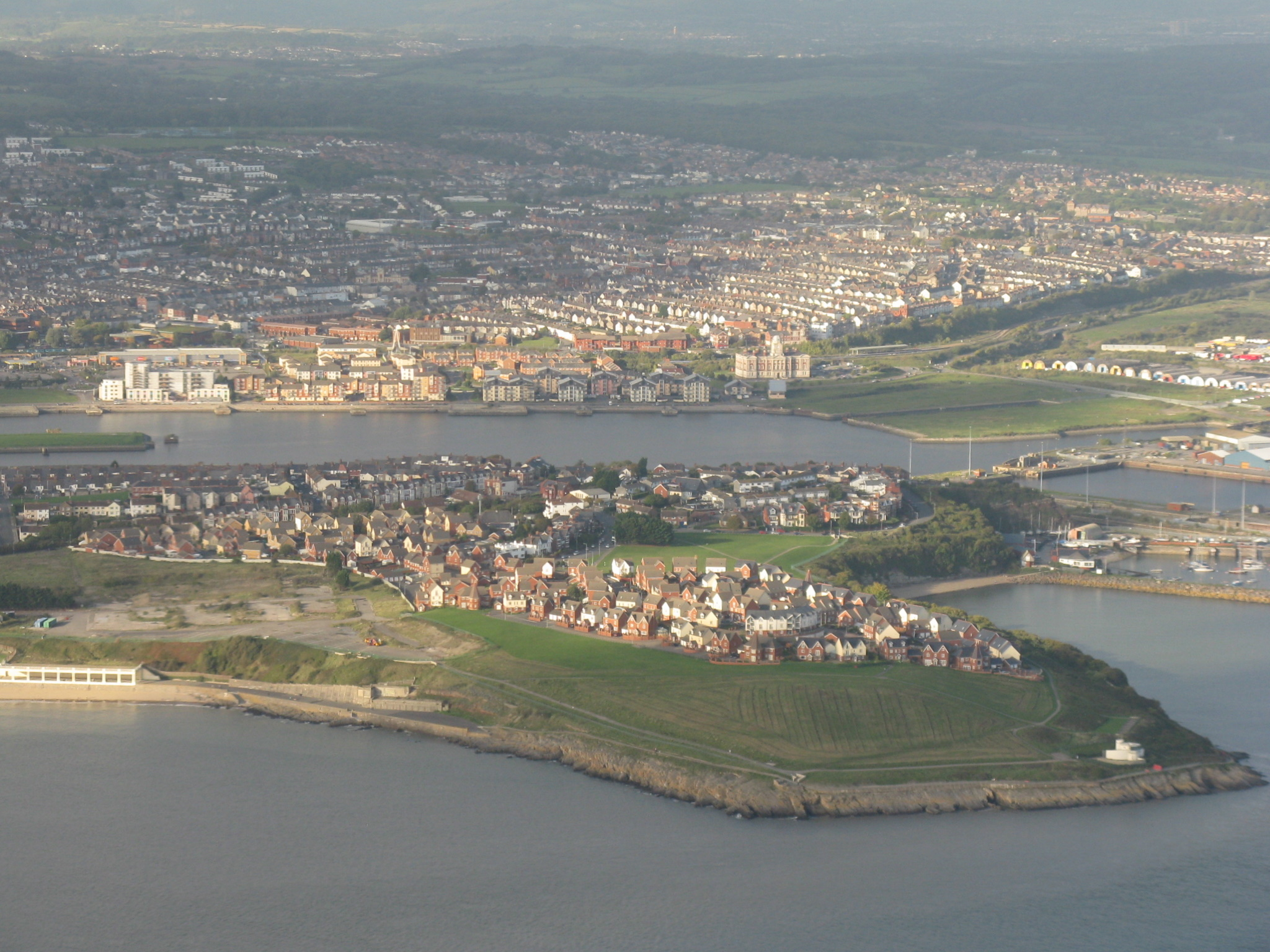
Nell's Point

In Roman times farmsteads existed on the site of Barry Castle and Biglis and there were verbal reports of discovery of a cemetery including lead coffins with scallop-shell decoration. Both St. Baruc's Chapel and St. Nicholas Church have re-used Roman bricks and tiles incorporated in their building fabric and a Roman villa was discovered in Llandough. In 1980 a Roman building consisting of 22 rooms and cellars in four ranges around a central courtyard was excavated at Glan-y-môr and is believed to be a third-century building associated with naval activity, maybe a supply depot.

The Vikings launched raids in the area and Barry Island was known to be a raider base in 1087. Flat Holm and Steep Holm islands in the Bristol Channel have their name Holm name derived from a Scandinavian word for an island in an estuary. The excavation of the Glan-y-môr site revealed the site had been reused in the 6th and 7th century and also between AD 830 and 950 as a dry stone sub-rectangular building with a turf or thatched roof.

=== Medieval Barry ===
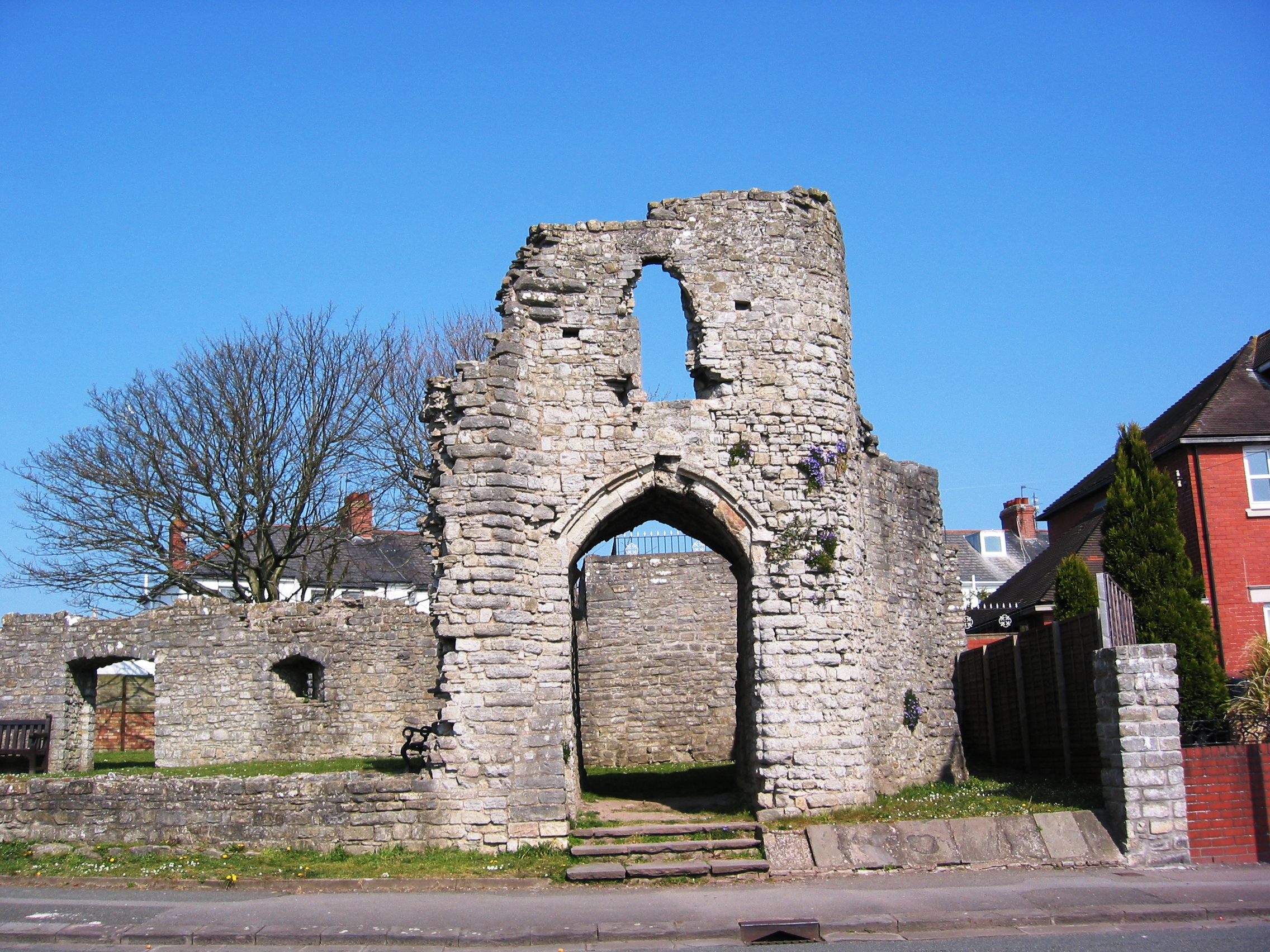
Barry Castle

The main feature of the area at this time was the island in the Bristol Channel, separated from the mainland by a tidal estuary. It is described in Giraldus Cambrensis or Gerald of Wales' Itinerarium Cambriae ("Journey through Wales", 1191). He states that Barry derives its name from St. Baruc whose remains are deposited in a chapel on the island. The local noble family who owned the island and the adjoining estates took the name of de Barri from the island.

Following the Norman Conquest of England the area was divided into manors with the Barry area split into two large lordships, Penmark and Dinas Powys. Penmark was split into the sub-manors of Fonmon, West Penmark and Barry. Dinas Powys was split into the sub-manors of Cadoxton and Uchelolau ('Highlight'). The sub-manor of Barry was granted by the de Umfraville family to the de Barri family and the seat of the manor was Barry Castle, located on high ground overlooking the Bristol Channel, a site occupied in Roman times by a native homestead. The castle was a small fortified manor house, built to replace an earlier earthwork. By the late 13th century the castle had two stone buildings on the east and west sides of a courtyard. Early in the 14th century the castle was strengthened by the addition of a large hall and gatehouse on its south side, the ruins of which are all that survive today. By now Barry had grown into a village and port with its own church and watermill but in the 14th century its population was drastically reduced by the Black Death and the consequences of the rebellion of Owain Glyndŵr. It took the population some 300 years to recover and once more hold the title of village, essentially a sparsely populated area with a few scattered farms and much of the land a marsh that a small river flowed through. By 1622 the pattern of fields, where enclosure was almost complete, around Barry village was pretty much as it was to remain until the growth of the modern town. According to the 1673 hearth tax list the parish contained thirteen houses.

Whitehouse Cottage, the oldest existing inhabited house in modern Barry, dates from the late 1500s with the east end of the building added in around 1600. It overlooks the sea at Cold Knap.

=== Industrial history ===
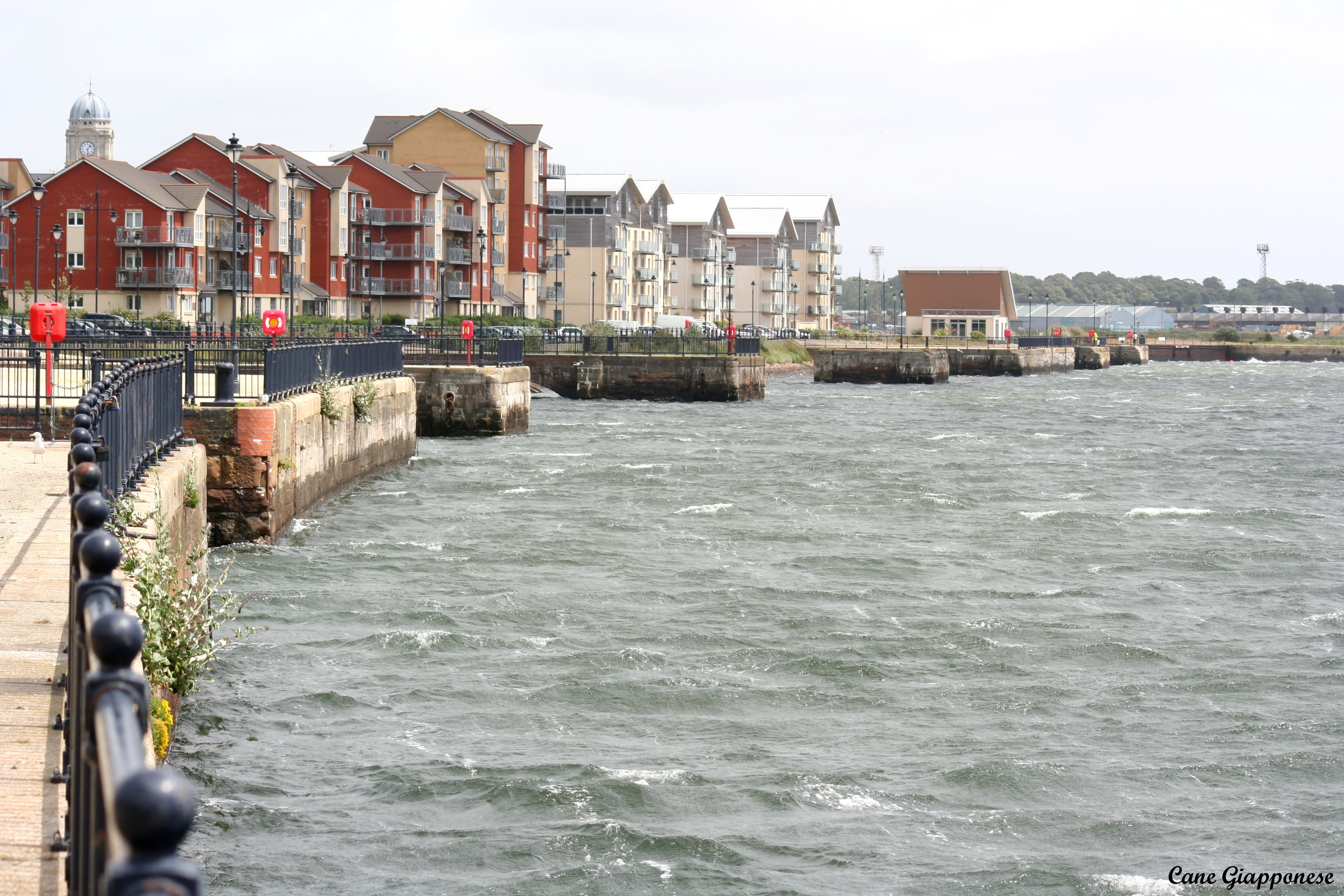
Barry Waterfront in July 2007

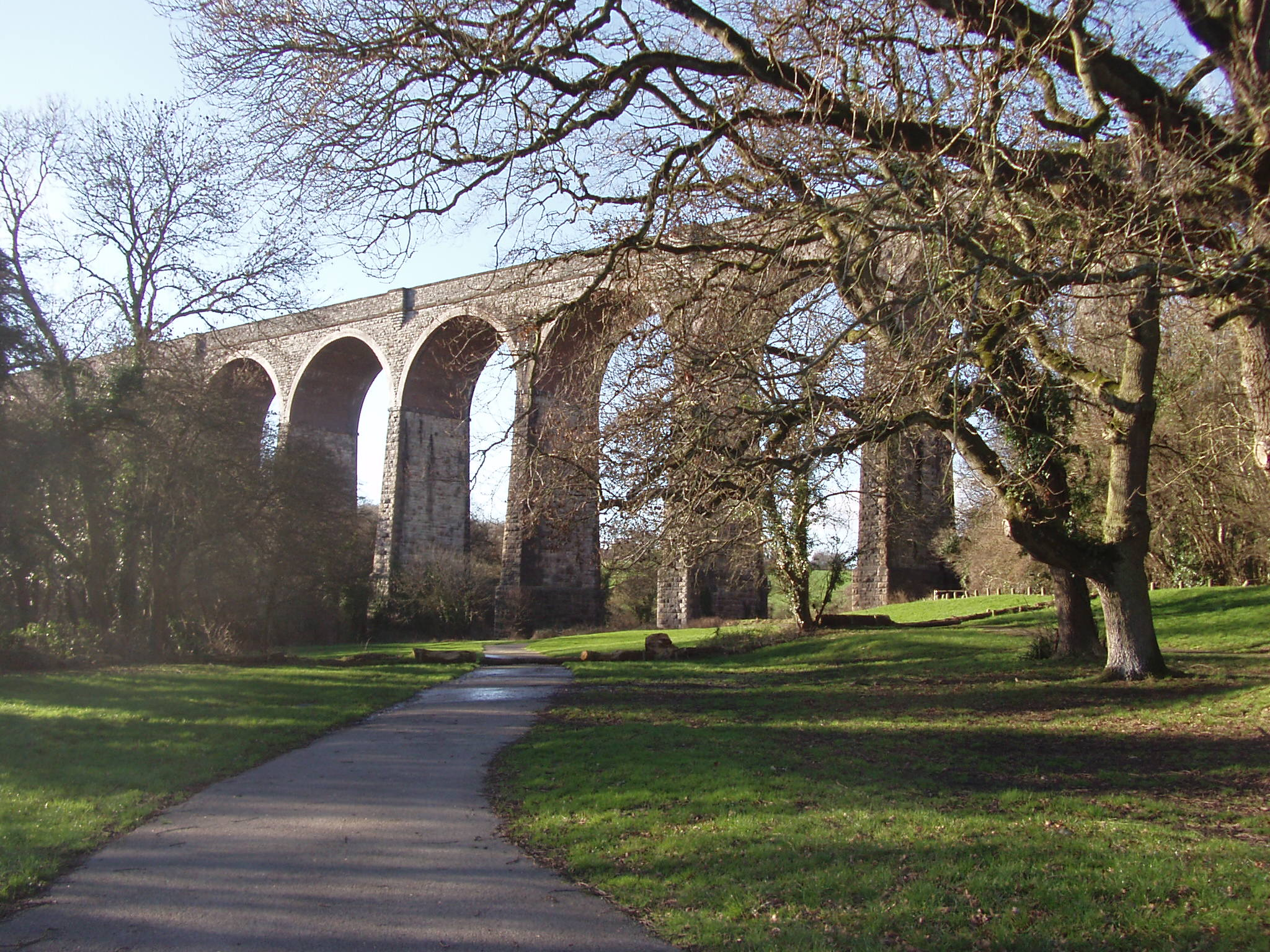
The viaduct at Porthkerry Park was once crossed many times daily by trains transporting coal from the valleys north of Bridgend

By 1871 the population of Barry was over 100, with 21 buildings, the new estate-owning Romilly family being involved in the buildup of the village but it remained a largely agricultural community. It grew when it was developed as a coal port in the 1880s. The coal trade was growing faster than the facilities at Tiger Bay in Cardiff ever could and so a group of colliery owners formed the Barry Railway Company and chose to build the docks at Barry. Work commenced in 1884 and the first dock basin was opened in 1889 to be followed by two other docks and extensive port installations. The Barry Railway brought coal down from the South Wales Valleys to the new docks whose trade grew from one million tons in the first year, to over nine million tons by 1903. The port was crowded with ships and had flourishing ship repair yards, cold stores, flour mills and an ice factory. By 1913, Barry was the largest coal exporting port in the world. Barry Council Office and Library was completed in 1908.

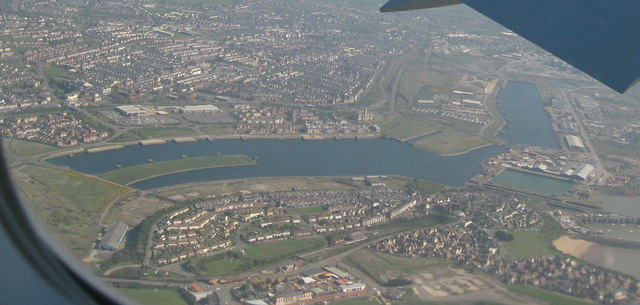
Barry Docks

Behind the docks rose the terraced houses of Barry which, with Cadoxton, soon formed a sizeable town. The railways which had played a major part in the development of the dock helped make Barry Island a popular resort. Barry Memorial Hall on Gladstone Road was inaugurated in November 1932, and obtained its name to honour those locals who lost their lives in World War I.

During its industrial peak a number of ships sank off the Barry coast.

=== Barry Scrapyard ===
Following the rise of diesel and electric power on the UK railways, the marshalling yards at Barry Docks became the largest repository of steam engines awaiting scrapping in the UK. Dai Woodham owned the Woodham Brothers Scrap yard and he allowed rail preservation organisations to buy back the locomotives at the scrap value, allowing around 200 of the 300 locomotives to be saved for future generations, although during the years of storage many were vandalised or looted by souvenir hunters. When interviewed just before his death, Woodham was reluctant to take full credit for this and pointed out that the town of Barry with its redundant sidings was the major factor in allowing these locomotives to be saved.

== Modern times ==
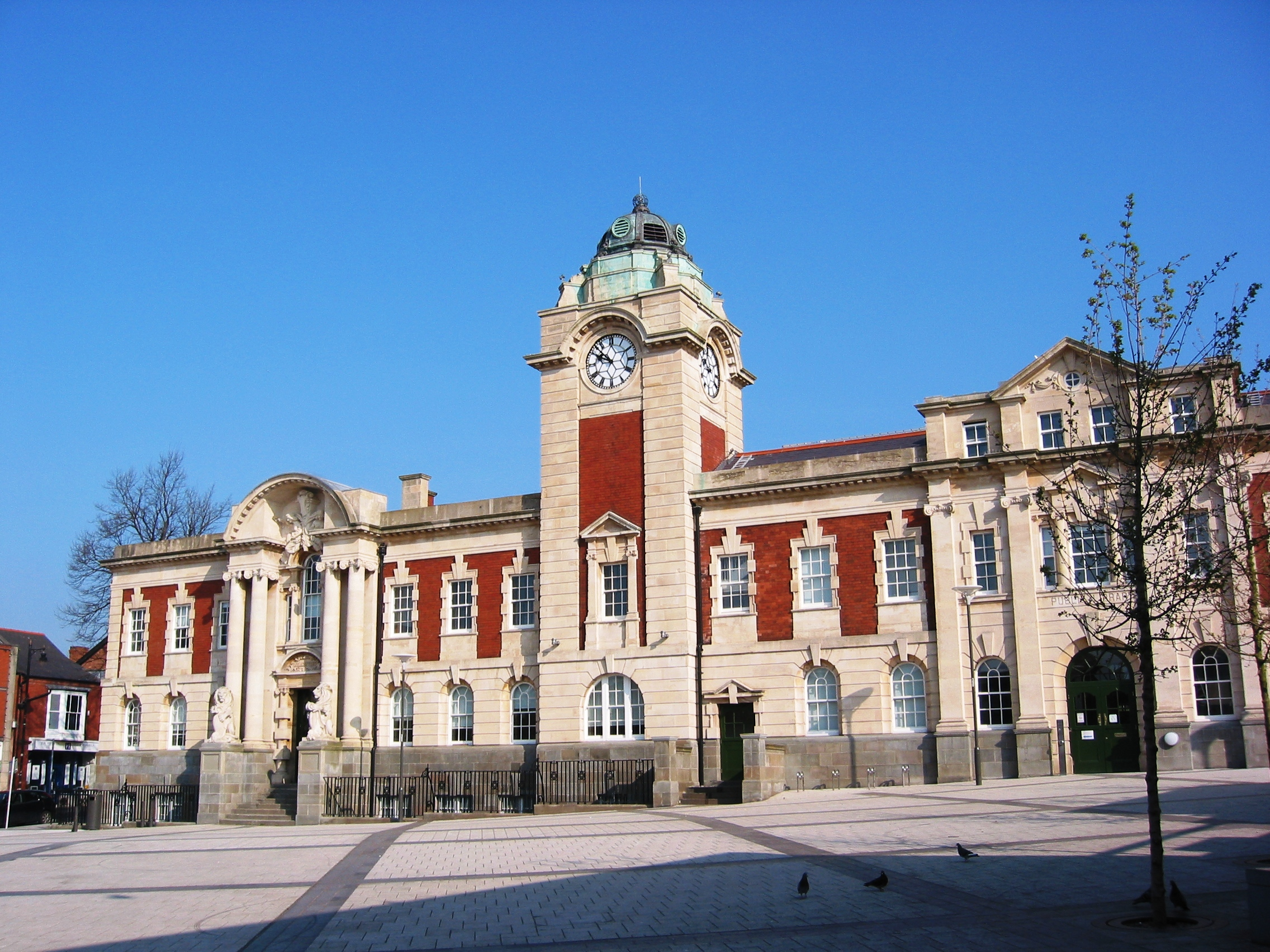
Barry Council Office and Library, King's Square, in the town centre

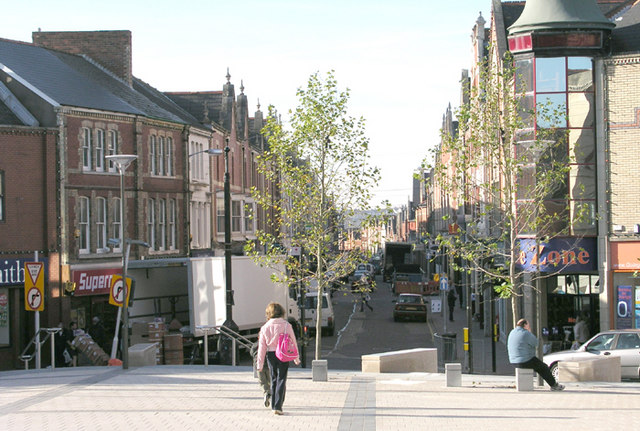
Holton Road

Barry is the administrative centre of the Vale of Glamorgan, and home to Barry Town United F.C.

The road from Bonvilston was originally the B4266, as only Pontypridd Road within the town still is, and the road from Highlight Park right through the Vale to Bridgend was the B4265, as beyond Cardiff International Airport it still is. Since the 1970s, parts of these roads are numbered A4226, with the result that the A4226 radiates from Weycock Cross roundabout in three directions.

Although still a port, Barry is more of a manufacturing town and as a service centre for the Vale of Glamorgan. Barry Docks and the adjoining industrial area form the largest employment centre in the town. The docks, whose road links were dramatically improved with the opening of the Docks Link Road in 1981, now have direct road access with the M4 motorway. The docks can handle vessels up to 23,000 tonnes and the first-class tidal position close to the deep-water channel of the Severn Estuary, allows for scheduled sailings. With its transit sheds, warehouses and open storage, the docks are equipped to handle bulk cargoes but with the scrapping of their former electric cranes, ships' own derricks have to be used or cranes hired in by ABP as required. Two roll on/roll off berths are available and have been used by routes to Ireland and West Africa. As at January 2016, Intermodal rail freight traffic is being operated from No. 2 Dock. With a new presence on the Mole in No. 1 Dock and the provision of a concrete slipway from it, leisure rowing and dinghy sailing is available (2016).

The town has a town council which is controlled by the Labour Party.

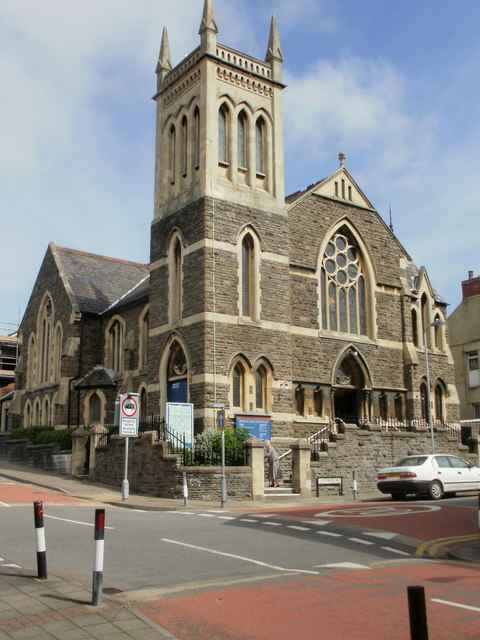
Holy Trinity Presbyterian Church

The majority of industrial firms are located in the dock area. The largest are the chemical producing concerns such as Cabot Carbon and Dow Corning who not long ago completed the development of the largest silicones plant in Europe. Other main employers in Barry Docks are Jewson Builders' Merchants, Western Welding and Engineering, Bumnelly, and Associated British Ports who, since 1982 have run the docks as successors to the British Transport Docks Board.

To the west of Barry is Porthkerry Park. This is a large area of open space, with woodlands, streams, and access to a pebbly beach. In the park is the former Barry Railway Company viaduct with 13 arched spans standing 110 ft high. Following the closure of the Vale of Glamorgan line to passengers between Barry and Bridgend in 1964, it was reopened on 10 June 2005 and for most of its 19 miles, provides a scenic view and link to Llantwit Major and beyond to Bridgend.

== Barry Island ==
The Barry Island peninsula was an island until the 1880s when it was linked to the mainland as the town of Barry expanded. This was partly due to the opening of Barry Dock by the Barry Railway Company. Established by David Davies, the docks now link up the gap which used to form Barry Island.

There is a railway station to access the island at Barry Docks, there is also a heritage railway station which houses refurbished steam passenger trains. The railway is open to the public and holds events involving a large steam engine replica of Thomas the Tank Engine.

Barry Island is now known for its beach and Barry Island Pleasure Park. From 1966, the island was home to a Butlins Holiday camp, which was closed in 1987 and taken over by Majestic Holidays who renamed it Barry Island Resort. Between Butlins' closure and Majestic's reopening the camp was used as for filming scenes in the "Shangri-La" holiday camp from the Doctor Who serial Delta and the Bannermen. The camp closed in 1996 after Majestic had a disagreement with the local council, who refused an entertainments licence unless work was carried out to improve the now 30-year-old site. It was redeveloped for housing between 1997 and 2003 with the remaining two camp buildings and outdoor pool demolished in early 2005.

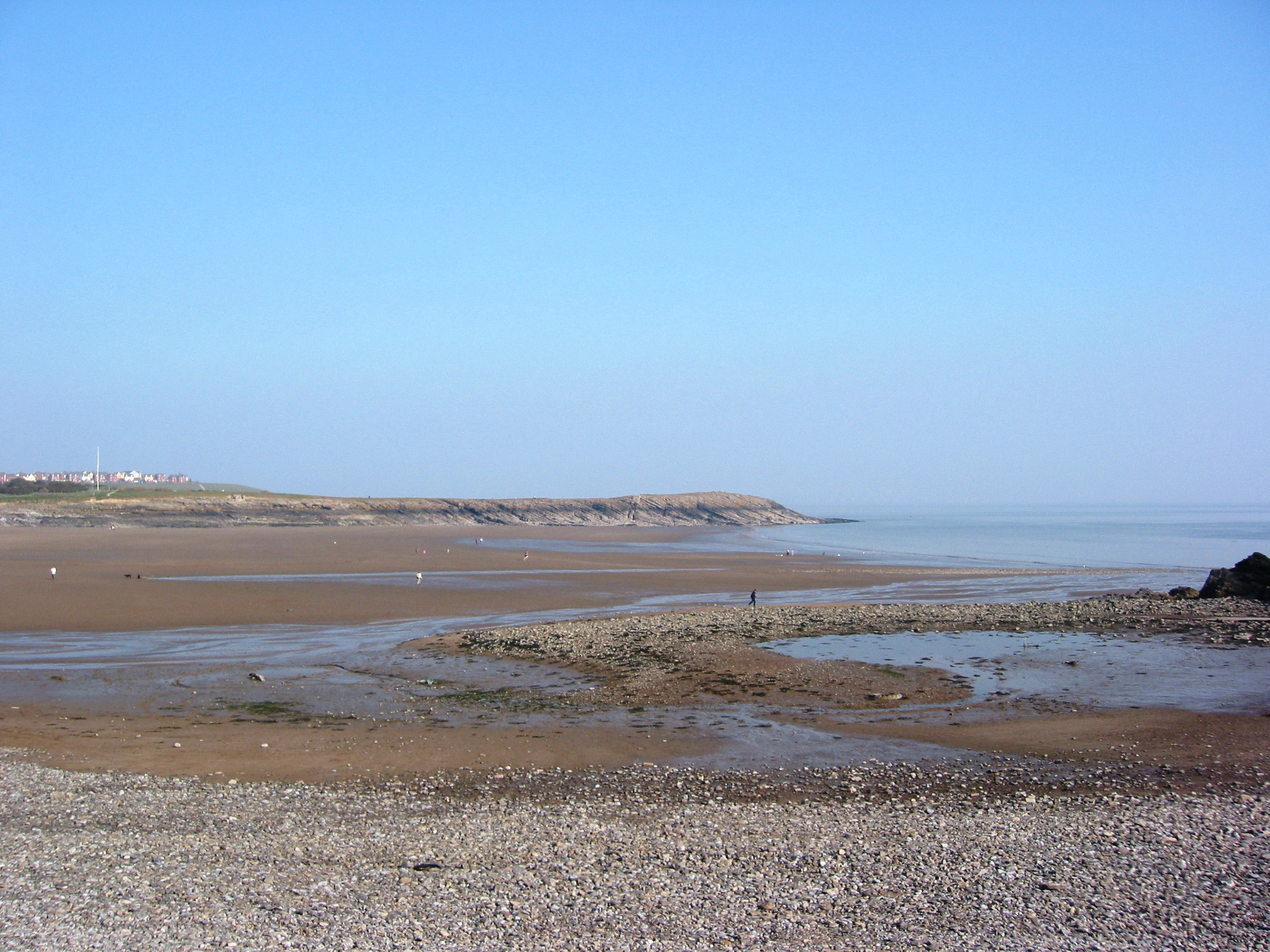
Watchtower Bay

The preserved Vale of Glamorgan Railway runs on Barry Island.

The BBC sitcom Gavin & Stacey was filmed in many areas of Barry and Barry Island, including establishments such as Marco's Café which feature in the show. Long-running medical drama Casualty which is filmed in Cardiff, regularly films scenes in and around Barry Island.

== Politics and administration ==
=== UK parliamentary constituency ===
From the 1536 Act of Union, Glamorgan was represented in parliament by one member, from the constituency of Glamorganshire, elected by the freeholders in the county. In 1885, the constituency was split, with Barry represented by South Glamorganshire. The Representation of the People Act 1918 created the Llandaff and Barry constituency. Sir William Cope (Conservative) won the 1918 general election. Labour regained the seat at the 1929 general election when Charles Ellis Lloyd was returned but two years later lost the seat to the Conservatives' Patrick Munro.

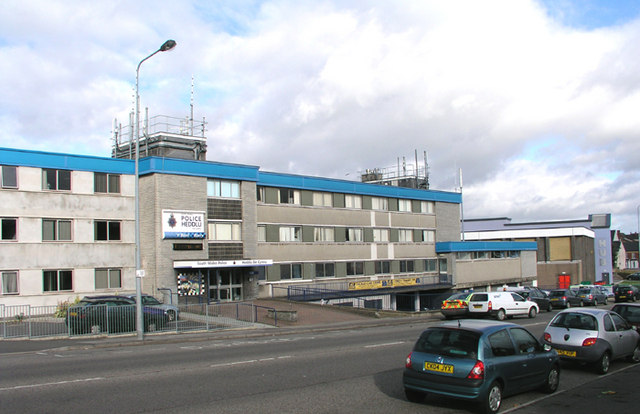
Barry Police Station in the Jenner district

After Munro's death in 1942 Cyril Lakin won the by-election for the Conservatives. Arwyn Lynn Ungoed-Thomas (Labour) won the seat at the 1945 general election. The Llandaff and Barry constituency was abolished by the Representation of the People Act 1948. and replaced by the Barry parliamentary constituency. This seat was first contested in the 1950 United Kingdom general election when Dorothy Rees (Labour) was elected. She lost the seat to Sir Herbert Raymond Gower (Conservative) at the 1951 general election. He held the seat until its abolition in 1983.

It was replaced by the Vale of Glamorgan constituency which Sir Herbert Raymond Gower (Conservative) won at the 1983 general election. He remained as MP until his death in 1989. At the subsequent by-election the seat was won by John Smith (Labour). At the 1992 general election Walter Sweeney (Conservative) won it by only 19 votes. That made it the most marginal seat in Britain. John Smith won it back at the 1997 general election. In the 2010 General election there was a 6.1% swing from Labour to Conservative. This resulted in the election of Alun Cairns, a Conservative MP who has held the seat until 2024.

=== Senedd (Welsh Parliament) ===
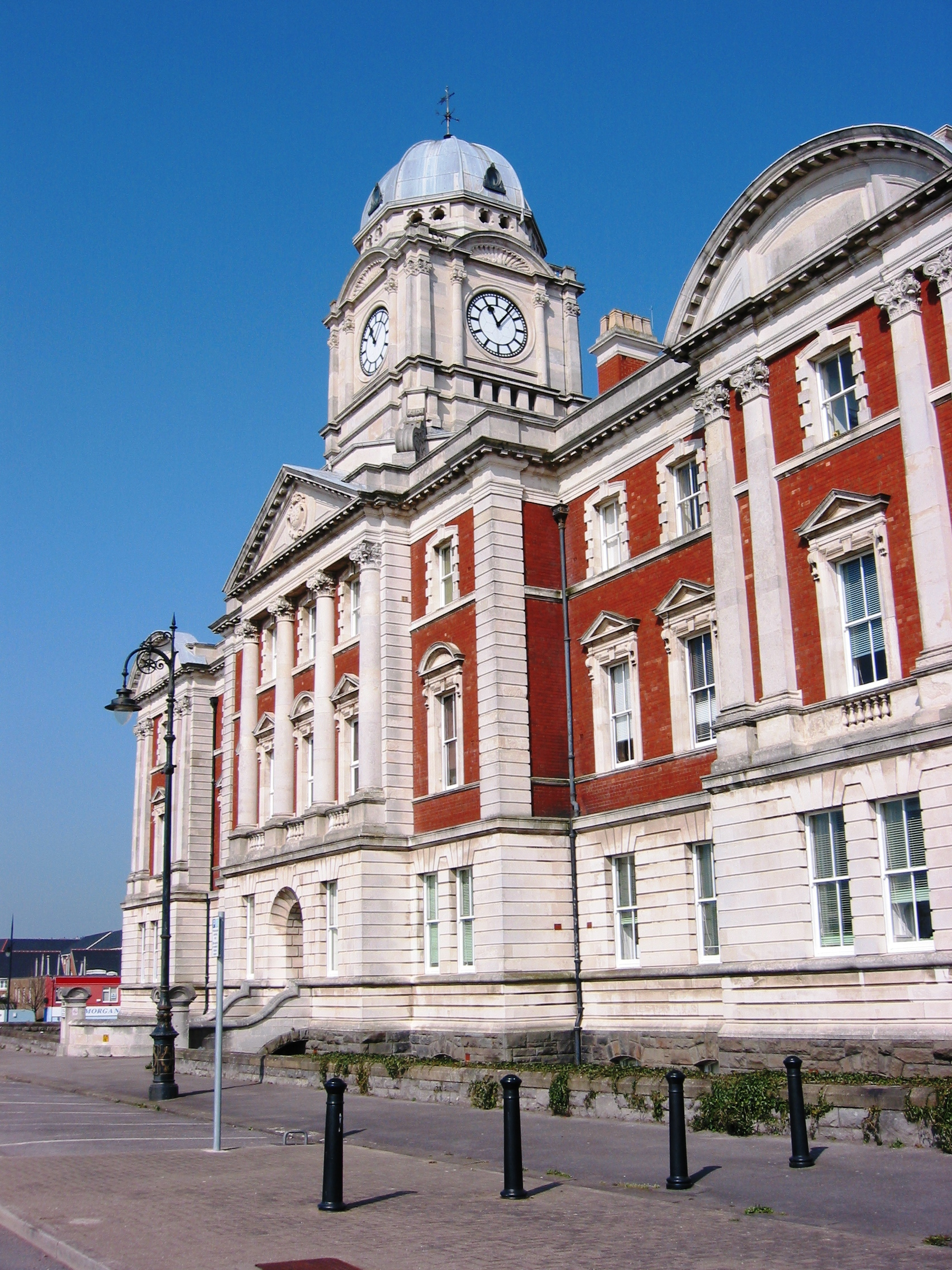
Barry Dock offices

Barry is part of the Vale of Glamorgan Senedd constituency and part of the South Wales Central Senedd region. Jane Hutt of the Welsh Labour Party has been the assembly member since the inception of the Senedd.

=== Local councils ===
Barry was incorporated as a municipal borough by royal charter in September 1939. The Borough was the successor to Barry and Cadoxton Local Board (1888–1894) and Barry Urban District Council (1894–1939). The area covered by the borough comprised Barry, Cadoxton-juxta-Barry, Merthyr Dyfan and parts of Penmark, Porthkerry and Sully. In 1974, it was abolished and its functions taken over by the Vale of Glamorgan District Council and South Glamorgan County Council.

The local council, Barry Town Council, is the largest town council in Wales. It has given Olympic silver medalist David Davies freedom of the town, the first freedom granted since 1958. . The town council has no overall control with Labour, Plaid Cymru and Conservative councillors.

The local unitary authority, created in 1995, is the Vale of Glamorgan Council which has its administrative headquarters in Barry. There are 23 wards electing 47 councillors, including eight wards in Barry (electing 18 county councillors) which comprise Baruc (2 councillors), Buttrills (2), Cadoc (3), Castleland (2), Court (2), Gibbonsdown (2), Dyfan (2) and Illtyd (3).

== Districts ==
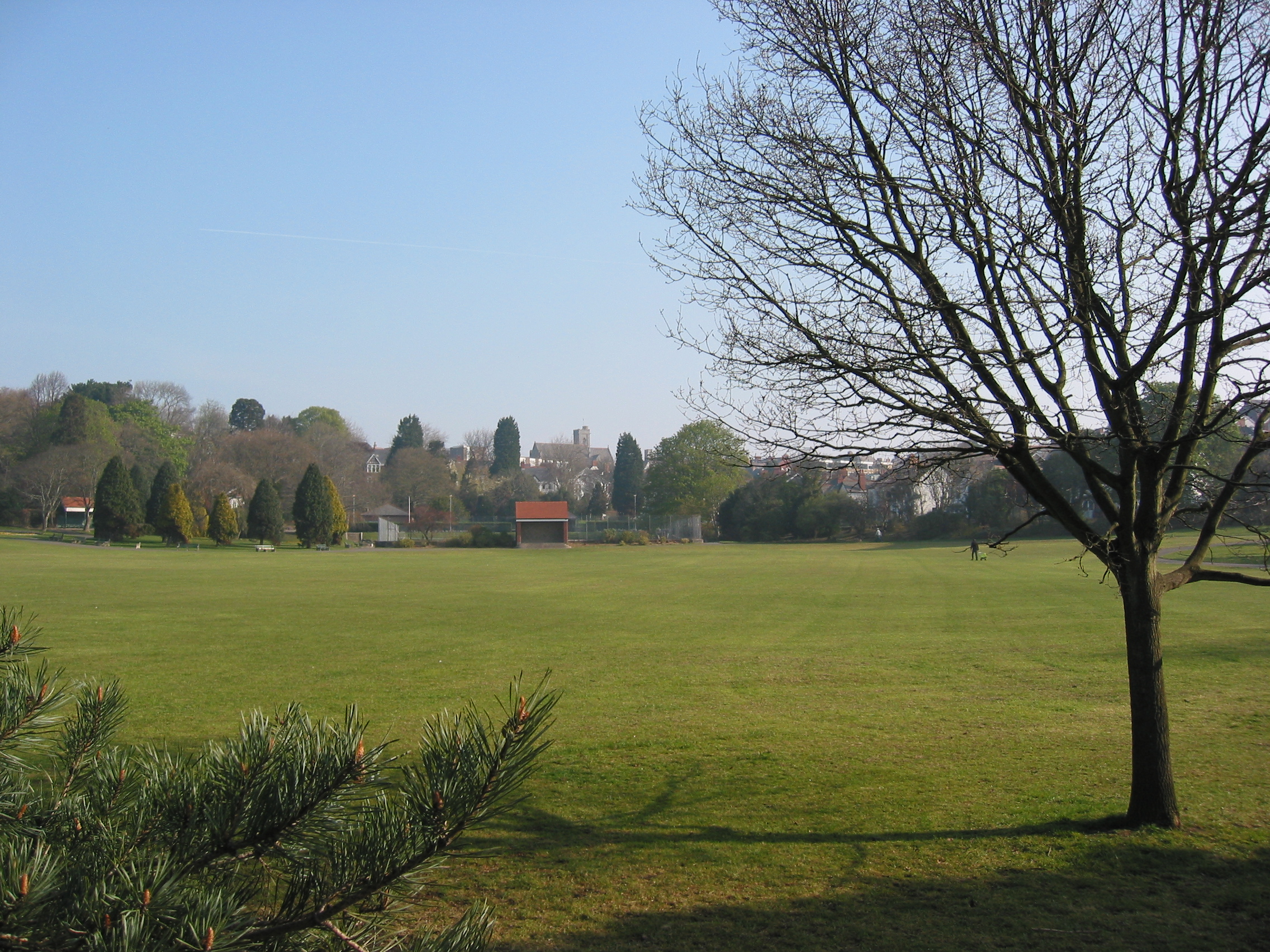
Romilly Park

- Barry Dock
- Barry Island
- Barry Waterfront
- Buttrills
- Cadoxton
- Colcot
- Coldbrook
- Cwm Talwg
- Gibbonsdown
- Gladstone
- Highlight Park
- Holton
- Jenner Park
- Merthyr Dyfan
- Palmerstown
- Pencoedtre
- Romilly

== Climate ==
As with the rest of the British Isles and Wales, Barry experiences a maritime climate with cool summers and mild winters, and often high winds. It is amongst the sunnier of Welsh locations, due to its southerly and coastal position. The nearest official weather observation station is at Cardiff Airport near Rhoose, about 3 miles (5 km) west of the town centre.

Climate data for Rhoose 65m asl, 1971–2000
| Month | Jan | Feb | Mar | Apr | May | Jun | Jul | Aug | Sep | Oct | Nov | Dec | Year |
|---|---|---|---|---|---|---|---|---|---|---|---|---|---|
| Mean daily maximum °C (°F) | 7.3 (45.1) | 7.5 (45.5) | 9.7 (49.5) | 12.0 (53.6) | 15.5 (59.9) | 18.2 (64.8) | 20.5 (68.9) | 20.4 (68.7) | 17.7 (63.9) | 14.0 (57.2) | 10.4 (50.7) | 8.3 (46.9) | 13.5 (56.3) |
| Mean daily minimum °C (°F) | 2.3 (36.1) | 2.0 (35.6) | 3.4 (38.1) | 4.5 (40.1) | 7.4 (45.3) | 10.1 (50.2) | 12.4 (54.3) | 12.4 (54.3) | 10.6 (51.1) | 8.0 (46.4) | 4.8 (40.6) | 3.3 (37.9) | 6.8 (44.2) |
| Average precipitation mm (inches) | 95 (3.7) | 69 (2.7) | 77 (3.0) | 60 (2.4) | 60 (2.4) | 64 (2.5) | 63 (2.5) | 83 (3.3) | 98 (3.9) | 106 (4.2) | 107 (4.2) | 103 (4.1) | 983 (38.7) |
| Mean monthly sunshine hours | 55 | 74 | 113 | 174 | 212 | 208 | 220 | 207 | 150 | 103 | 74 | 49 | 1,639 |
Source: Météo-France

== The arts ==
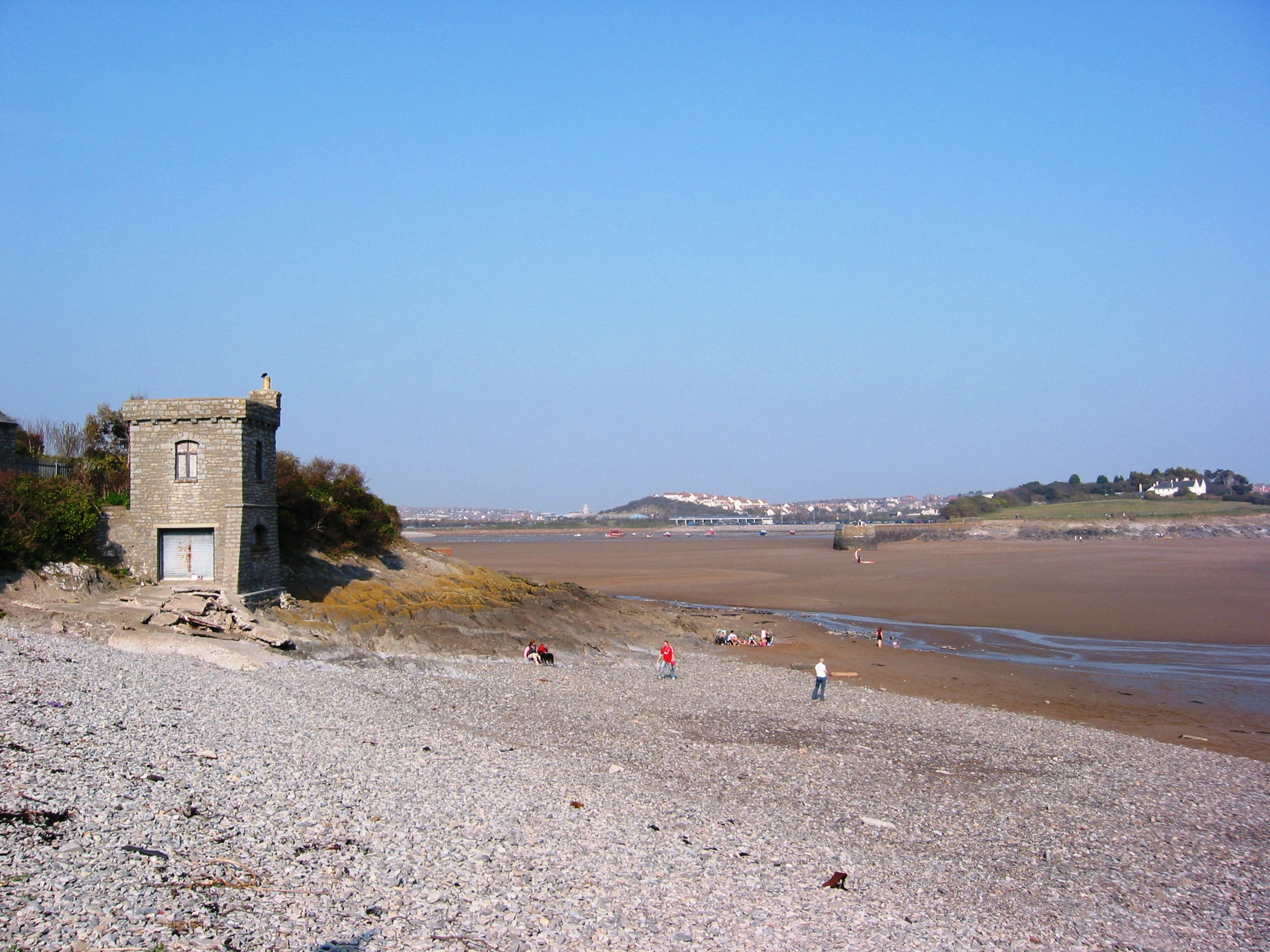
The Old Harbour

- Series 3–5 of Being Human (2010 on) was filmed in and around Barry Island, with much of the storyline referring to the town as "infested" with werewolves and vampires.
- The 2011 film Submarine, although set in Swansea was mostly filmed in Barry.
- Barry hosted the National Eisteddfod of Wales in 1920 and 1968.
- The Doctor Who serial Delta and the Bannermen was set and filmed in Barry.
- Several scenes of the Doctor Who episodes "The Empty Child" and "The Doctor Dances" were filmed at the Vale of Glamorgan Railway sites at Plymouth Road and Barry Island in January 2005.
- Gavin & Stacey is partly set and filmed in and around Barry.
- Art Central, a modern art gallery run by the local council, was created in the Town Hall as part of the library redevelopment in 2006.
- Watercolour artist Thomas Frederick Worrall lived in Barry from 1913 until his death in 1957. Several of his paintings of Barry and other areas in the Vale of Glamorgan are in the National Library of Wales.
- Composer Grace Williams (1906 – 1977), generally regarded as Wales's most notable female composer, was born in Barry and lived there during her latter years. Her best known works include Fantasia on Welsh Nursery Tunes and Sea Sketches.
- Memo Arts Centre on Gladstone Road is the largest arts centre in the Vale of Glamorgan. In addition to a programme of a range of live arts and entertainment, the Memo has a 4K Sony Digital Cinema with Dolby Surround Sound. The Memo's Cinema screens blockbusters, independent films and live streaming broadcasts such as National Theatre's NT Live shows.
- The Small Space on Island Road is "The World's Smallest Magic Theatre". In addition to magic, the theatre also puts on jazz performances and comedy.

== Education ==
=== Secondary schools ===
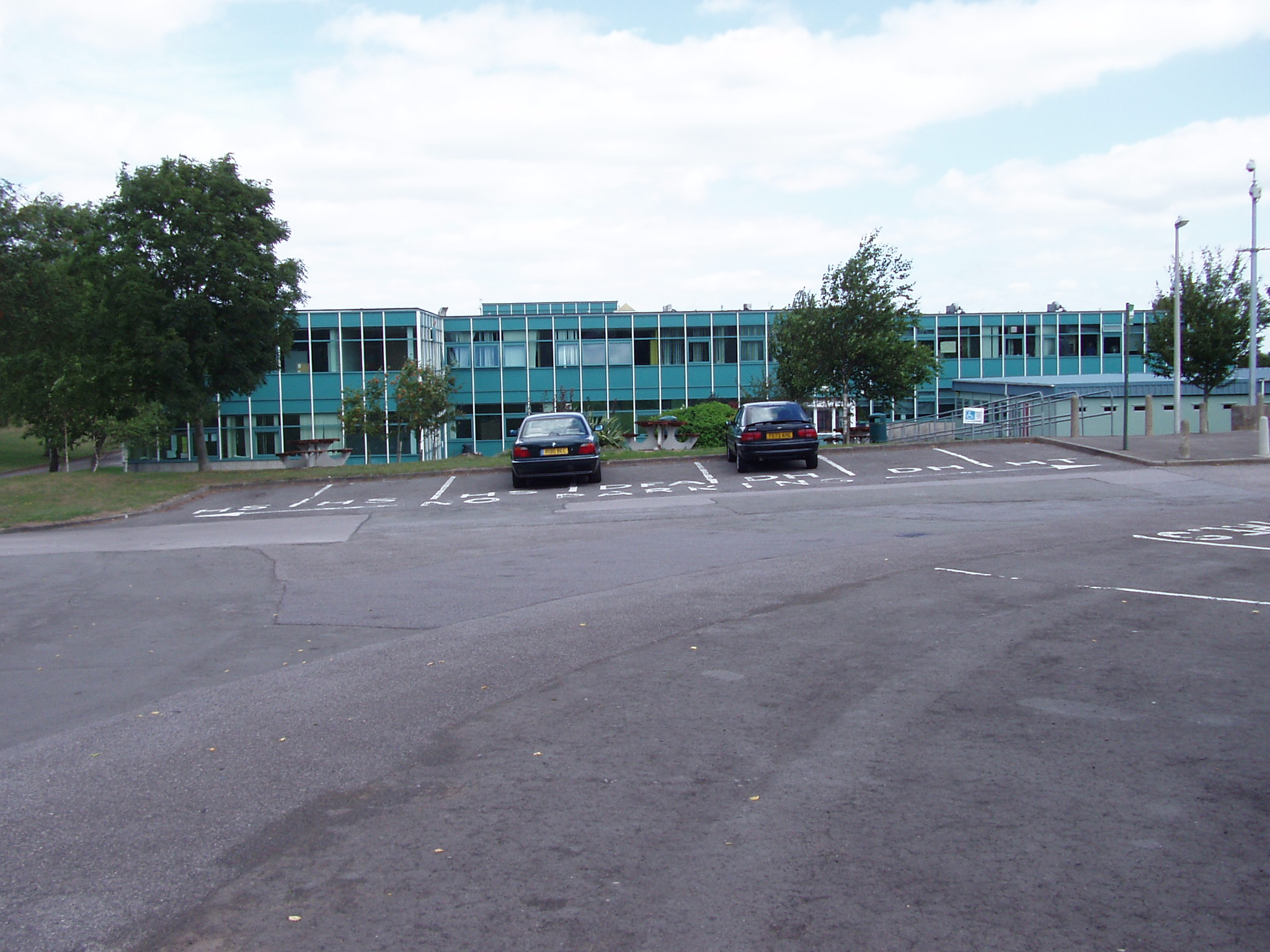
Pencoedtre High School

Barry has four secondary schools. Since 1993, Bryn Hafren and Barry Comprehensive School have worked together to provide the co-educational Barry Sixth Form. In July 2018, as part of the 'Transforming Secondary Education in Barry' scheme, both Barry Comprehensive School and Bryn Hafren closed their doors to make way for two new mixed-sex secondary schools which opened in September 2018. The old Barry Comprehensive School site has now become Whitmore High School and Bryn Hafren has now become Pencoedtre High School.

- Whitmore High School – mixed 11–18
- Pencoedtre High School – mixed 11–18
- St Richard Gwyn Catholic High School – mixed 11–16
- Ysgol Gyfun Bro Morgannwg – Welsh-medium school, mixed 11–18

=== Primary schools ===
Primary education (5–11) in Barry is provided by a number of community, Welsh-language, and faith-based schools spread throughout the town.

- All Saints Church in Wales Primary School
- Barry Island Primary School
- Cadoxton Primary School
- Colcot Primary School
- Gladstone Primary School
- High Street Primary School
- Holton Primary School
- Jenner Park Primary School
- Oakfield Primary School
- Palmerston Primary School
- Romilly Primary School
- St Helen's RC Infants School (5–7)
- St Helens's RC Junior School (7–11)
- Ysgol Gwaun y Nant – Welsh-medium school
- Ysgol Nant Talwg – Welsh-medium school
- Ysgol Sant Baruc – Welsh-medium school
- Ysgol Sant Curig – Welsh-medium school

== Sport ==
- Barry Town United F.C.
- Barry RFC
- Sea View RFC
- Barry 40

== Transport ==
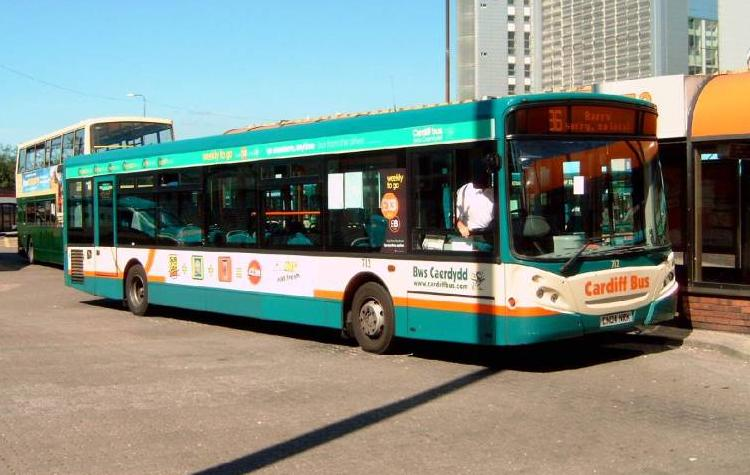
A Cardiff Bus en route to Barry

The main forms of public transport in the town are bus and rail. Barry is served by Cardiff Bus which operates services to Llantwit Major, Penarth, Cardiff International Airport and Cardiff City Centre as well as operating town circular services. Barry's King's Square bus station is located on King's Square in the town centre. The A4050 road connects Barry to Culverhouse Cross Interchange and the rest of west Cardiff.

There are four railway stations in the town: Barry, Barry Docks, Barry Island and Cadoxton. These are operated and served by Transport for Wales and are on the Valley Lines network, a commuter rail network focused on Cardiff. Services operate westbound to Bridgend via Llantwit Major and Rhoose Cardiff International Airport, and eastbound to Cardiff Queen Street via Dinas Powys, Cardiff Grangetown and Cardiff Central. The latter service can continue to either Merthyr Tydfil, Pontypridd and/or Aberdare.

Barry is located less than 3 miles (4.8 kilometres) east of Cardiff International Airport.

== Nearby places ==
- Barry Island, now joined to the mainland by a causeway carrying a road and a railway line
- The Bendricks, a rocky beach by the harbour
- Sully Island, a small tidal islet a mile east of the harbour
- Sully, a village east of the town

== Notable people ==
See also Category:People from Barry, Vale of Glamorgan

- Gordon Love Bastian (1902–1987), hero in World War II
- Grace Williams (1906–1977), generally regarded as Wales's most notable female composer
- Gwynfor Evans (1912–2005), Welsh nationalist politician, leader of Plaid Cymru, was from Barry
- Elfyn Richards (1914–1995), aeronautical and acoustical engineer, was born in Barry and educated at Barry Grammar School.
- John Habakkuk (1915–2002), economic historian, was born in Barry and attended Barry County School
- Elvira Gwenllian Payne (1917 - 2007), a politician and community activist who became Wales' first Black female councillor.
- John Darwin Hinds (1922 - 1981), Wales' first Black, Muslim councillor in 1958 and Wales's first Black mayor.
- Irving Davies (1926–2002), choreographer, was born in Barry
- Barnett Janner, Baron Janner (1892 –1982), lived in Barry, where his father had a furniture shop
- Robert Tear (1939 - 2011), operatic tenor who regularly sang at many of the world's great opera houses
- Damian Green (born 1956), Conservative politician, is from Barry
- Julia Gillard (born 1961), 27th Prime Minister of Australia, was born in Barry, and migrated with her family to Australia, in 1966
- Derek Brockway (born 1967), BBC Wales meteorologist and TV presenter, was born in Barry was educated at Barry Comprehensive School
- Rhodri Williams (born 1968), sports journalist, is from Barry.
- Gareth Jones (13 August 1905 – 12 August 1935), journalist
- Derek Tapscott (30 June 1932 – 12 June 2008), Welsh international footballer
- Bryn Merrick (12 October 1958 – 12 September 2015), musician
- Gerran Howell (born 25 February 1991), actor, was educated at Barry Comprehensive School
- Alan Evans (academic) (born 1952), neuroscientist, was born in Barry Dock and attended Barry Comprehensive School
- Lee Selby (born 1987), boxer, former world champion
- Andrew Selby (born 1988), boxer
- Annes Elwy (born 1992) Actress, went to school in Barry
- Mike Bubbins (born 1972) Comedian and actor, born in Barry and attended Barry Comprehensive School
- Richard Taylor (1981– 2004), skater, was from Barry
- Margaret Lindsay Williams (1888–1960), portrait artist, lived in Barry for part of her life and is buried there

== Freedom of the Town ==
The following people and military units have received the Freedom of the Town of Barry.

=== Individuals ===
- Major Edgar Jones: 26 April 1950.
- Sophie Ingle: 18 October 2018.

=== Military units ===
- RAF St Athan: 1959.
