= King Square, Barry =

Town square in Barry, Wales

Coordinates: 51.4065°N 3.2667°W

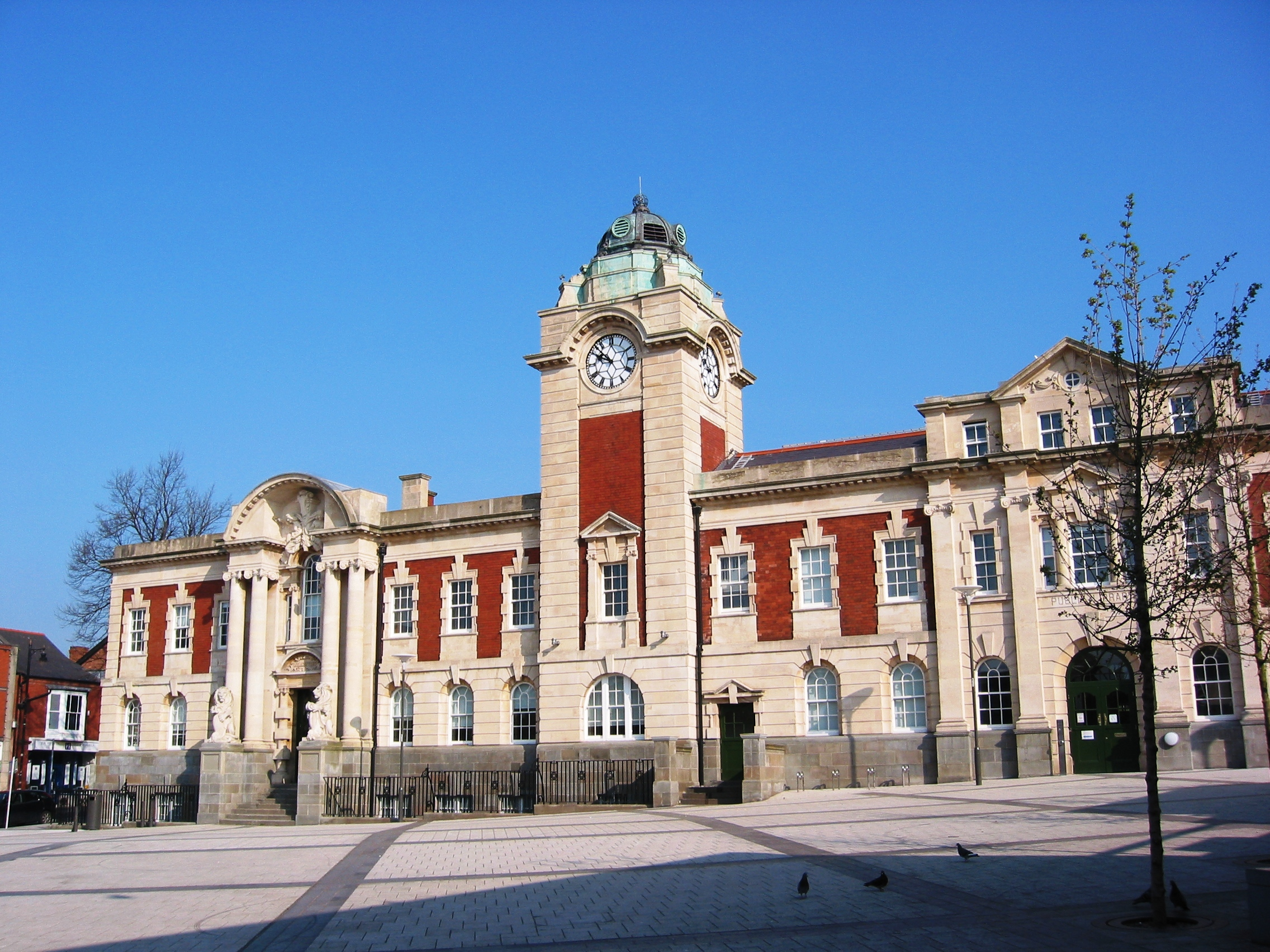
Barry Town Hall at King Square.

King Square is a town square in central Barry, Wales located at a central shopping point of Holton Road.

The square was originally known as Council Square after the Town Hall was opened in 1908. In June 1910 it was proposed it was renamed King Edward Square after Edward VII, but as the proclamation ceremony of George V's ascent to the throne had been held there the previous month, it was renamed simply, as King Square.

The square underwent much renovation in the early 2000s. Today, it houses the Barry Council Office and Library, Art Central Gallery and several bus stops.

The square hosts a Christmas tree every year, though it is sometime the victim of practical jokes. In December 2014 it was the location of what was described as the "best Christmas lights switch-on" in Wales, when a 10-minute animated show was projected onto the facade of the Town Hall.
