= Baruc =

6th-century Welsh saint

Baruc (Welsh: Barrwg Welsh pronunciation: [ˈbarʊɡ]; also known as Barruc, Barrog or Barry) was a 6th-century Welsh saint.

Saint Baruc, who was a disciple of Saint Cadoc, forgot to bring the latter's reading matter with him on a journey from the island of Flat Holm. Cadoc sent him back and he drowned in the Bristol Channel on the return journey. He was buried on Barry Island in the Vale of Glamorgan, Wales. The ruins of a chapel dedicated to him can still be seen in Friars Road, Barry Island. His feast day is 27 September.

Baruc gives his name to a Welsh-language primary school in Barry called "Ysgol Gymraeg Sant Baruc" and also the electoral borough in Barry known as the Baruc ward.

== St Baruc's Chapel ==
In the summers of 1894 and 1895 exploratory excavations took place in Barry Island. During these evacuations St. Baruc's chapel was uncovered with no appearance of buildings existing before the evacuations began. The chapel was estimated to be built at the beginning of the eight century and survived, with several alterations, until sometime in the seventeenth century before it was buried by sand. The chapel was small and poorly built of local stone. The chapel originally had an apsidal chancel and a square window in its north wall, at a later date the apse had been pulled down and the chancel slightly lengthened, and a square wall erected with an early English window. The English window contained a variety of stones, with most of them being Sutton stone; the window also contained three Bridgend sandstone and several Bath oolite stones. The walls of the chapel were 2 feet 2 inches thick. There were two or three floors in the body of the church, the first being simply an earth floor, this afterwards being covered over with a layer of clay; above this had been a concrete floor. In the chancel was a well-paved floor of Lias stone slabs, under which appeared to be the remains of a former floor of Lias stones. Two rather poorly formed buttresses were erected outside of the northern and southern walls of the chancel.

The dimensions of the chapel were:

- Length of the body of church 19 feet 9 inches (6.02 meters)
- Width 11 feet (3.4 meters)
- Length of apsidal (original) chancel 11 feet 6 inches (3.51 meters)
- Width of chancel 9 feet 2 inches (2.79 meters)

St. Baruc's well can also be found 300 yard south of the chapel, this well was used as a wishing well. It was believed if a votive offering was dropped into this well and a wish or prayer was privately expressed and the wisher did not speak to anyone till after a stranger spoke to them then what they wished would come true. In September 1895 the well was cleaned out and numerous offerings were found, offerings that were found included: bent pins, a brass buckle, a wheel of a small clock, and a number of bits of rags, tape and string. The normal offering was pins that were either bent or straight. To the south and east of the chapel an extensive grave was found, trenches cut across in different places gave indications that several thousand bodies had been at one time or other buried there. This large number of bodies in an island that certainly never contained more than two inhabited houses, seems to point out that Barry Island, had somewhat the reputation of a holy island, and that bodies had, therefore, been brought from elsewhere for interment here.
