= Romilly, Vale of Glamorgan =

Romilly
- District of Barry
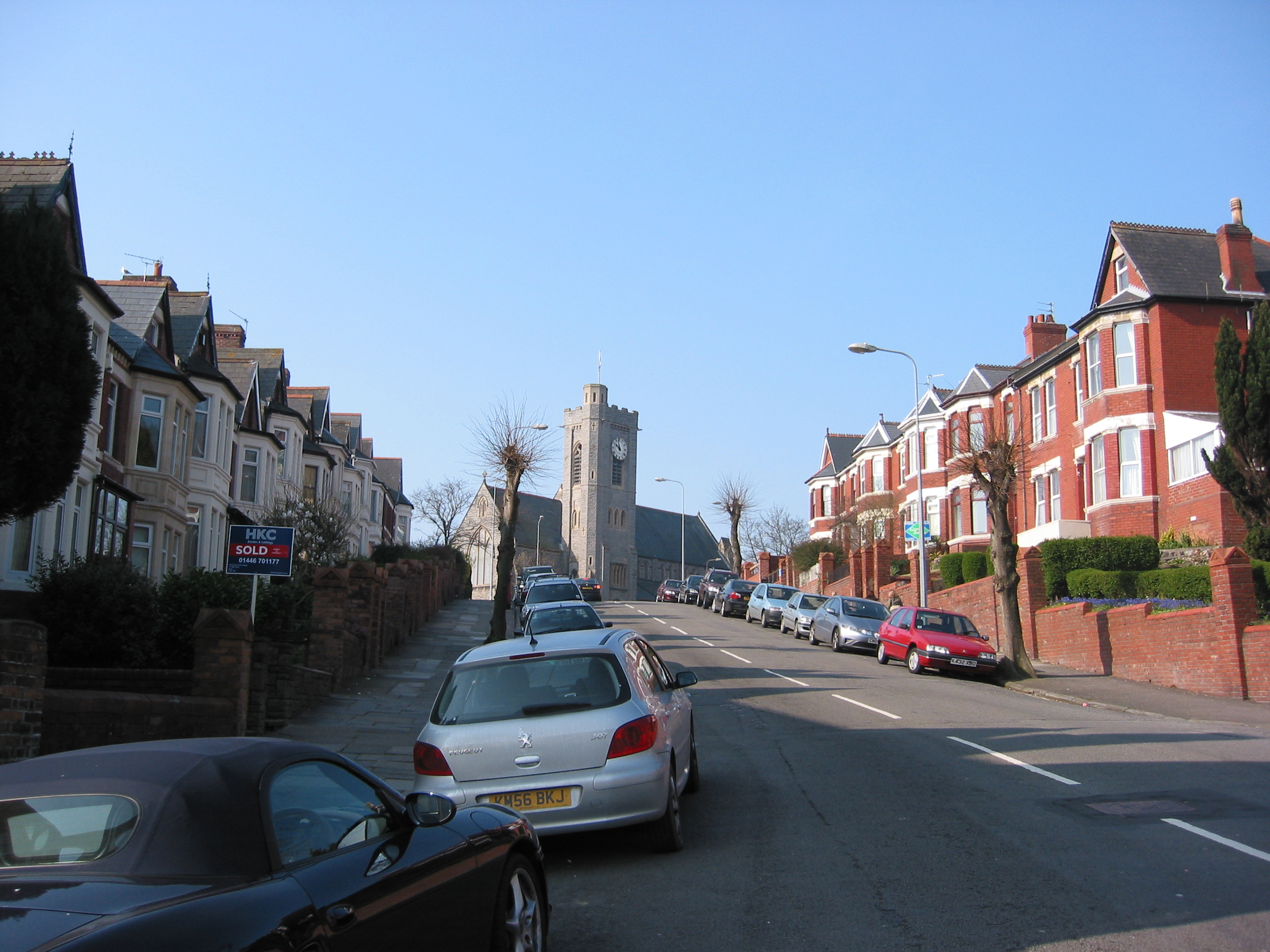
- A typical street in Barry, All Saints Church pictured at the top of the hill

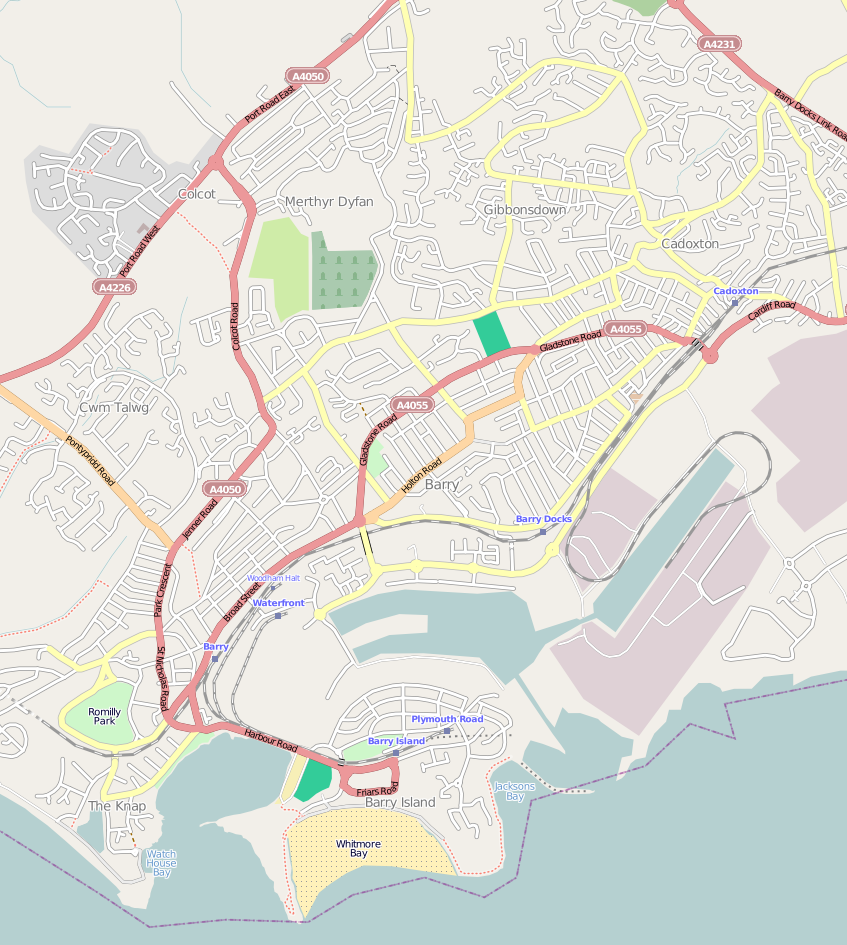
- Location in Barry
- Coordinates: 51°23′52.8″N 3°17′13.2″W
- Country: United Kingdom
- Region: Wales
- County: Vale of Glamorgan
- Town: Barry
- Time zone: UTC+0 (GMT)

Romilly is a western district of Barry in the Vale of Glamorgan, South Wales, United Kingdom.

The area has an attractive public park which includes an extensive field and tennis court facilities. It is located around the corner from Cold Knap. An educational centre was built on Romilly Road in 1957. The park is listed at Grade II on the Cadw/ICOMOS Register of Parks and Gardens of Special Historic Interest in Wales.

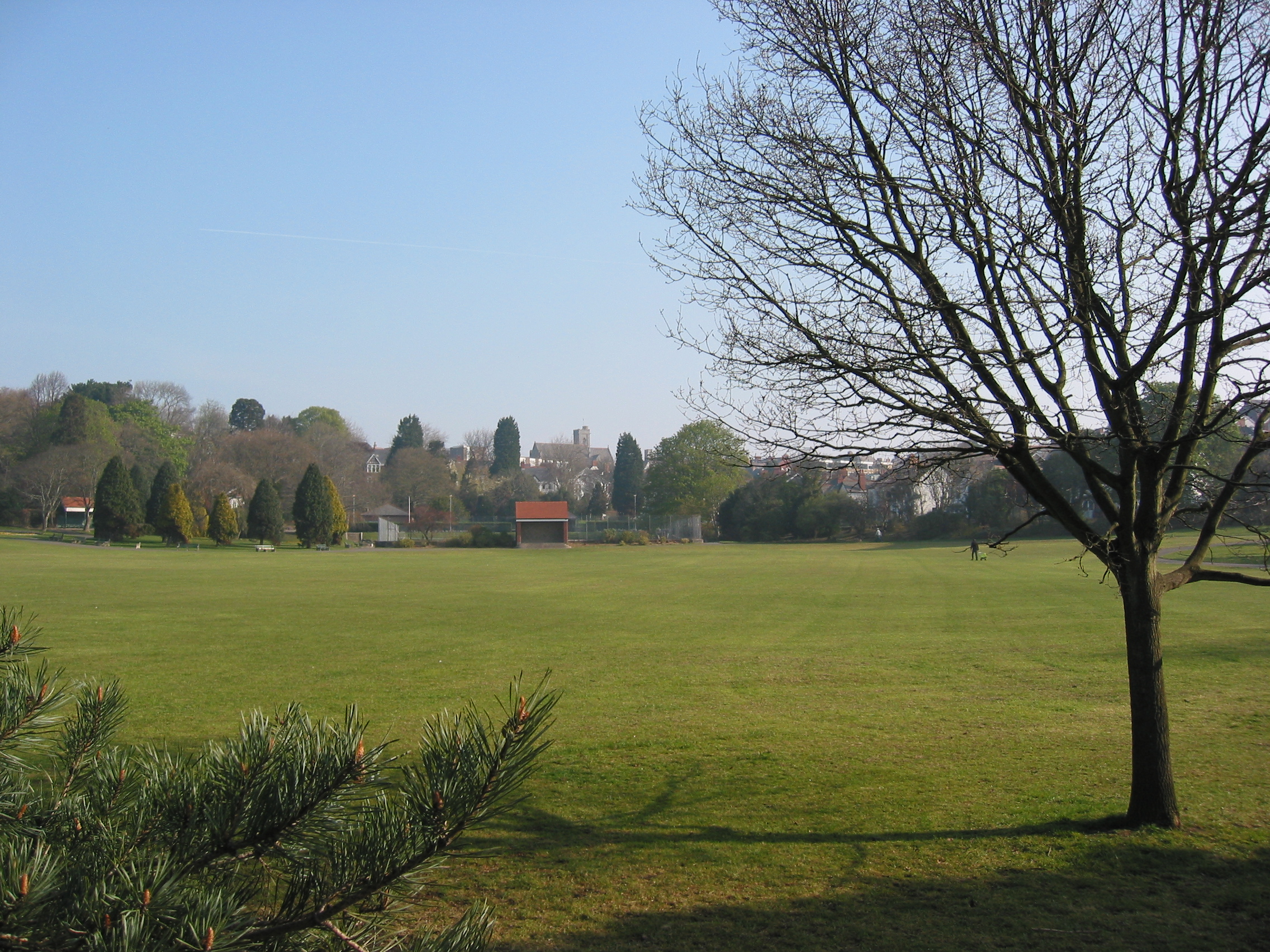
Romilly Park
