= 1995 Vale of Glamorgan Council election =

1995 Welsh local government election

The 1995 Vale of Glamorgan Council election was held on 4 May 1995 to the new Vale of Glamorgan Council unitary authority in Vale of Glamorgan, Wales. It took place on the same day as other council elections in Wales and England. These were the first elections since the re-organization of local government in Wales.

Though the Conservative Party had led the previous council, their representation was decimated at the 1995 election, with Labour winning a majority.

The next full elections took place in 1999.

== Overview ==
These were the first elections held following local government reorganisation, which created new 'super authorities' and would lead to the abolition of South Glamorgan County Council on 1 April 1996. Vale of Glamorgan councillors would act in a shadow capacity to the new Vale of Glamorgan Council, until the following April.

47 council seats across 22 electoral wards were up for election. The ward boundaries for the new authority were based primarily on the previous Vale of Glamorgan Borough Council, though there were some boundary changes. Ewenny transferred to the Vale, with the Llandow ward becoming Llandow/Ewenny. The St Brides Major and Wick communities, was which was previously within the Borough of Ogwr, transferred to become a new Vale ward of St Brides Major, increasing the number of Vale councillors by one.

== Election result ==
Twenty Conservative councillors had been elected at the 1991 election. At the 1995 election their number was reduced to six, in what the South Wales Echo described as an unanticipated "annihilation" at the hands of the Labour Party. All five seats in the previously 'safe' Conservative Alexandra ward were won by Labour, as were two of the three 'safe' Conservative seats in Cowbridge. Plaid Cymru also took seats from the Conservatives, increasing their numbers to five.

Vale of Glamorgan Council election result 1995
Party	Seats	Gains	Losses	Net gain/loss	Seats %	Votes %	Votes	+/−
Labour	36			+15	76.5			
Conservative	6			-14	12.7			
Plaid Cymru	5			+2	10.6			
Liberal Democrats	0				0.0			
Independent	0			-2	0.0			
Green	0				0.0			

== Ward results ==
Contests took place in every ward,^{(a)} the first time this had happened in the Vale since 1973.

=== Alexandra (five seats) ===
Alexandra (Penarth) 1995
Party	Candidate	Votes	%	±%
Labour	(Ms) Lorraine Barrett	2,059	34.5	
Labour	J. Birch	1,848		
Labour	P. Gray ^{+}	1,847		
Labour	(Ms) G. Emmerson	1,732		
Labour	N. Fogg	1,649		
Conservative	A. Ernest ^{o+}	1,580	28.8	
Conservative	A. Wicks ^{o}	1,357		
Conservative	C. Osborne ^{o}	1,348		
Conservative	(Ms) D. Turner ^{+}	1,334		
Independent	M. Cranfield-Adams	1,300	23.7	
Conservative	A. Williams ^{o}	1,282		
Plaid Cymru	D. Harries	544	9.9	
Plaid Cymru	(Ms) M. Harries	514		

=== Baruc (two seats) ===
Baruc (Barry) 1995
Party	Candidate	Votes	%	±%
Plaid Cymru	Nicholas Hodges	810	35.4	
Labour	(Ms) B. Griffiths	734	32.1	
Labour	(Ms) B. Sharp	721		
Plaid Cymru	(Ms) M. Corp	703		
Conservative	J. Donovan ^{+}	634	27.7	
Conservative	B. Edmunds ^{o}	524		
Conservative	G. Grant ^{o}	178		
Liberal Democrats	(Ms) S. O'Brien	111	4.8	

=== Buttrills (two seats) ===
Buttrills (Barry) 1995
Party	Candidate	Votes	%	±%
Labour	(Ms) M. Alexander	907	51.4	
Labour	S. Egan	789		
Independent Labour	B. Lane ^{+}	616	24.5	
Conservative	J. Connell	340	13.5	
Independent	B. Dixon ^{o}	245	9.8	
Plaid Cymru	W. Landry	225	9.0	
Liberal Democrats	J, Cornwall	178	7.1	

=== Cadoc (three seats) ===
Cadoc (Barry) 1983
Party	Candidate	Votes	%	±%
Labour	F. Johnson ^{+}	1,273	55.5	
Labour	(Ms) A. Moore	1,245		
Labour	N. Moore ^{o}	1,220		
Independent Labour	S. James	396	17.3	
Independent Labour	B. Lewis	310		
Independent Labour	J. Murphy	303		
Conservative	A. James	215	9.4	
Conservative	W. Nunn	198		
Plaid Cymru	(Ms) R. Joseph	188	8.2	
Conservative	J. Parker	184		
Plaid Cymru	K. Stockdale	176		
Plaid Cymru	J. Lawrence	166		
Green	I. Gooderson	121	5.3	
Liberal Democrats	J. Mock	100	4.4	

=== Castleland (two seats) ===
Castleland 1995
Party	Candidate	Votes	%	±%
Labour	M. Sharp ^{+}	831	74.8	
Labour	C. Short ^{o}	815		
Conservative	J. Williams	148	13.3	
Conservative	S. Newman	143		
Plaid Cymru	B. Shaw	132	11.9	
Plaid Cymru	A. Dearing	132		

=== Cornerswell (two seats) ===
Cornerswell (Penarth) 1995
Party	Candidate	Votes	%	±%
Labour	(Ms) A. Rees ^{+}	1,196	49.8	
Labour	N. Gibbs ^{o}	1,153		
Conservative	J. Flanigan ^{o}	743	31.0	
Conservative	K. Land	482		
Liberal Democrats	D. Elston	295	12.3	
Plaid Cymru	G. Ap-Sion	166	4.1	

=== Court (two seats) ===
Court (Barry) 1995
Party	Candidate	Votes	%	±%
Labour	Shaun Stringer ^{o}	1,120	65.5	
Labour	J. Thompson ^{o}	1,068		
Plaid Cymru	R. Salter	217	12.7	
Conservative	K. Wright	176	10.3	
Conservative	R. Suchorzeloski	144		
Liberal Democrats	(Ms) M. Lupton	100	5.8	
Green	(Ms) J. Gooderson A'Court	96	5.7	

=== Cowbridge (three seats) ===
Cowbridge 1995
Party	Candidate	Votes	%	±%
Labour	J. Baty	1,187	45.0	
Conservative	R. Davies ^{o}	1,088	41.2	
Labour	G. Hughes	1,042		
Conservative	T. Jarvie ^{o}	1,041		
Conservative	B. Rees	955		
Labour	A. Price	875		
Plaid Cymru	H. Llewellyn-Morgan	364	13.8	
Plaid Cymru	H. Lewis	196		

=== Dinas Powys (four seats) ===
Dinas Powys 1995
Party	Candidate	Votes	%	±%
Plaid Cymru	Christopher Franks ^{o+}	1,891	45.9	
Plaid Cymru	M. Thomas ^{o}	1,433		
Plaid Cymru	(Ms) J. Jones ^{o}	1,376		
Plaid Cymru	R. Bowen	1,303		
Conservative	B. McParlin ^{o}	987	24.0	
Labour	(Ms) S. Collins	981	23.8	
Labour	(Ms) J. Davies	951		
Labour	P. Evans	824		
Labour	J. Harvey	769		
Conservative	M. Pound	759		
Conservative	(Ms) C. Wilcock	591		
Conservative	H. Stephens	580		
Liberal Democrats	(Ms) C. Southwell	262	6.4	

=== Dyfan (two seats) ===
Dyfan (Barry) 1995
Party	Candidate	Votes	%	±%
Labour	C. Watkins ^{+}	1,115	61.9	
Labour	A. Dobbinson ^{o}	1,073		
Conservative	B. Mepham	357	19.8	
Conservative	S. Rogers	317		
Plaid Cymru	P. Donovan	194	10.8	
Liberal Democrats	(Ms) S. Boundy	135	7.5	
Plaid Cymru	O. Phillips	122		

=== Gibbonsdown (two seats) ===
Gibbonsdown (Barry) 1995
Party	Candidate	Votes	%	±%
Labour	B. Murray ^{+}	1,168	73.3	
Labour	R. Wilkinson ^{o}	1,111		
Plaid Cymru	T. Morgan	167	10.5	
Conservative	C. R. Lambert	153	9.6	
Conservative	C. E. Lambert	152		
Liberal Democrats	H. Lupton	106	6.6	

=== Illtyd (three seats) ===
Illtyd (Barry) 1995
Party	Candidate	Votes	%	±%
Labour	C. Dunkley ^{o}	1,514	48.1	
Labour	N. Brown ^{o}	1,438		
Labour	M. Nugent	1,266		
Conservative	A. Hampton ^{o}	1,139	36.2	
Conservative	K. Williams	911		
Conservative	(Ms) V. Lloyd	676		
Plaid Cymru	(Ms) S. Baker	262	8.3	
Liberal Democrats	A. Matthews	235	7.5	
Plaid Cymru	J. Chedgzoy	233		
Plaid Cymru	D. Roberts	216		

=== Llandough (one seat) ===
Llandough 1983
Party	Candidate	Votes	%	±%
Labour	D. Eastwood	394	60.5	
Independent	(Ms) E. Hanley	141	21.7	
Conservative	T. Roche	116	17.8	

=== Llandow/Ewenny (one seat) ===
Llandow/Ewenny 1995
Party	Candidate	Votes	%	±%
Conservative	R. Thomas ^{o+}	532	41.0	
Labour	(Ms) C. Price	505	38.9	
Liberal Democrats	(Ms) S. Wilson	93	7.2	
Independent	(Ms) J. Horton	87	6.7	
Plaid Cymru	J. Bellin	80	6.2	

=== Llantwit Major (four seats) ===
Llantwit Major 1995
Party	Candidate	Votes	%	±%
Labour	(Ms) L. Hughes ^{o+}	2,661	58.2	
Labour	(Ms) J. Pearce ^{o}	2,118		
Labour	M. Pearce ^{o}	1,988		
Labour	G. Williams	1,475		
Conservative	E. Bryant	826	18.1	
Conservative	J. Jones	809		
Conservative	A. Readman	765		
Conservative	A. Preddy	621		
Liberal Democrats	(Ms) D. Van-Rooyen	403	8.8	
Plaid Cymru	S. Stephens	380	8.3	
Green	(Ms) A. Markey	302	6.6	

=== Peterston-super-Ely (one seat) ===
Peterston-super-Ely 1995
Party	Candidate	Votes	%	±%
Conservative	A. Williams	490	63.2	
Liberal Democrats	(Ms) S. Willey	285	36.8	

=== Rhoose (two seats) ===
Rhoose 1995
Party	Candidate	Votes	%	±%
Conservative	(Ms) H. James ^{o+}	949	42.8	
Conservative	H. James ^{o}	616		
Labour	(Ms) R. Bowen	556	25.1	
Labour	J. King	504		
Ind. Conservative	(Ms) A. Matthews	422	19.0	
Liberal Democrats	D. Stevens	167	7.5	
Plaid Cymru	J. Evans	122	5.5	

=== St Athan (one seat) ===
St Athan 1995
Party	Candidate	Votes	%	±%
Labour	B. Doughty ^{+}	611	60.1	
Independent	J. James ^{o}	293	28.8	
Conservative	(Ms) V. Rees	79	7.8	
Liberal Democrats	B. Van Rooyen	34	3.3	

=== St Brides Major (one seat) ===
St Brides Major 1995
Party	Candidate	Votes	%	±%
Labour	M. Lalis	589	49.6	
Conservative	(Ms) A. Preston	449	37.8	
Liberal Democrats	A. Wilson	150	12.6	

=== Stanwell (two seats) ===
Stanwell 1995
Party	Candidate	Votes	%	±%
Labour	H. Rees ^{+}	945	62.1	
Labour	(Ms) M. Birch ^{o}	929		
Conservative	D. Webb	341	22.4	
Plaid Cymru	N. ap Glyn	236	15.5	

=== Sully (one seat) ===
Sully 1995
Party	Candidate	Votes	%	±%
Labour	R. Cox	693	47.0	
Conservative	C. Aynge	583	39.6	
Liberal Democrats	B. Southwell	124	8.4	
Plaid Cymru	D. Haswell	74	5.0	

=== Wenvoe (one seat) ===
Wenvoe 1995
Party	Candidate	Votes	%	±%
Conservative	Michael Harvey	470	44.0	
Labour	M. Stringer	268	25.1	
Liberal Democrats	(Ms) S. Campbell	222	20.8	
Plaid Cymru	(Ms) E. Jones	108	10.1	

(a) Elections Centre source compares the percentage vote of the lead candidate for each party in the ward. It also indicates which candidates are female.

^{o} councillor elected to the Borough Council in 1991, standing for re-election
^{+} councillor elected to South Glamorgan County Council in 1993
