= Vale of Glamorgan Borough Council =

The Vale of Glamorgan Borough Council was the local authority for the Vale of Glamorgan in South Glamorgan, Wales, created in 1974 and reconstituted in 1996 as the Vale of Glamorgan Council unitary authority. It was a second tier district authority, with South Glamorgan County Council providing county-level services to the area.

== History ==
Vale of Glamorgan Borough Council and Cardiff City Council were created as district authorities, upon the creation of the county of South Glamorgan on 1 April 1974. The Vale of Glamorgan covered the whole area of three former districts, and parts of another two districts, which were abolished on the creation of the new council:

- Barry Municipal Borough
- Cardiff Rural District (part)
- Cowbridge Municipal Borough
- Cowbridge Rural District (part)
- Penarth Urban District

Under the Local Government (Wales) Act 1994, South Glamorgan County Council was abolished and Vale of Glamorgan became a unitary authority, taking over the provision of the services previously provided by the county council in its area. The borough boundaries were also amended, gaining the communities of Wick, St Brides Major, and Ewenny from the borough of Ogwr.

== Political control ==
The first election to the council was held in 1973, initially operating as a shadow authority alongside the outgoing authorities until it came into its powers on 1 April 1974. Political control of the council from 1974 until the council's abolition in 1996 was as follows:

Party in control	Years
No overall control	1974–1976
Conservative	1976–1991
No overall control	1991–1996

In 1973, 41 councillors were elected from fourteen wards, in preparation for the new council. This increased to 49 councillors elected from 18 wards at the next election, in 1976.

At the 1983 election, the number of councillors reduced to 46 though the number of wards increased to twenty-one.

The council elected a mayor annually.

== Premises ==
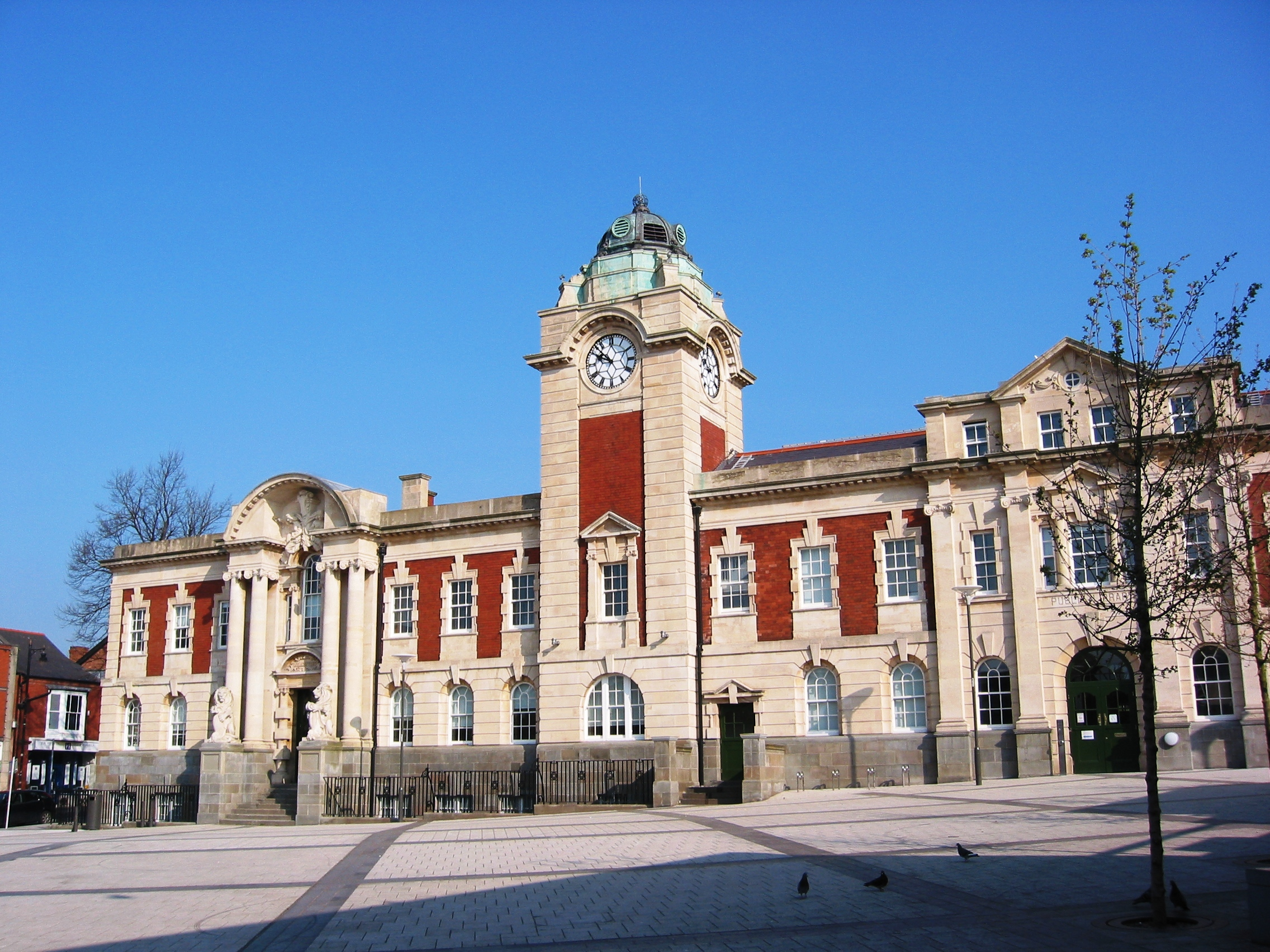
Barry Town Hall

The council was initially based at Barry Town Hall, which had been built in 1908 for the Barry Borough Council, one of the council's predecessors. In 1981 the council moved to a new building called the Civic Offices on Holton Road in Barry.

== Electoral divisions ==
As a result of The Borough of Vale of Glamorgan (Electoral Arrangements) Order 1982, between 1983 and 1996 the borough was divided into 21 electoral wards returning 46 councillors:

Ward	Councillors	Communities/wards included
Alexandra	5	Plymouth and St Augustines (Penarth town wards)
Baruc	2	Baruc (Barry town ward)
Buttrills	2	Buttrills (Barry town ward)
Cadoc	3	Cadoc (Barry town ward)
Castleland	2	Castleland (Barry town ward)
Cornerswell	2	Cornerswell (Penarth town ward)
Court	2	Court (Barry town ward)
Cowbridge	3	
Dinas Powys	4	
Dyfan	2	Dyfan (Barry town ward)
Gibbonsdown	2	Gibbonsdown (Barry town ward)
Illtyd	3	Illtyd (Barry town ward)
Llandough	1	Llandough (community)
Llandow	1	
Llantwit Major	4	
Peterston-super-Ely	1	
Rhoose	2	
St Athan	1	St Athan (community)
Stanwell	2	Stanwell (Penarth town ward)
Sully	1	Sully (community)
Wenvoe	1	Wenvoe (community)
