= 1983 Vale of Glamorgan Borough Council election =

Local election in Wales

The 1983 Vale of Glamorgan Borough Council election was held on Thursday 5 May 1983 to the Vale of Glamorgan Borough Council in South Glamorgan, Wales. It took place on the same day as other district council elections in Wales and England. The Conservative Party won a healthy majority on the council.

The previous Vale of Glamorgan Council election took place in 1979 and the next full elections took place in 1987.

== Ward changes ==
A number of ward changes came into effect at this election, particularly in the town of Penarth, which was divided into three new wards, Alexandra, Cornerswell and Stanwell. The overall number of councillors elected reduced to 46.

== Overview ==
The Conservatives increased their majority at this election. After the results of the Alexandra ward were declared the following day, they held 32 of the 46 seats.

Despite taking control of Penarth Town Council the previous year, the SDP-Liberal Alliance had a very disappointing result, failing to win a seat. They had hoped to win seats in Barry, where Labour's Allan Maidment and Hector Gosling had defected to the Alliance.

In the Llandough ward, the sitting Conservative Mayor of the Vale of Glamorgan, Susan Thomas, lost her seat, though by only three votes.

Vale of Glamorgan Borough Council election result 1983
Party	Seats	Gains	Losses	Net gain/loss	Seats %	Votes %	Votes	+/−
Conservative	32				69.5			
Labour	10				21.7			
Plaid Cymru	2				4.3			
Independent	2				4.3			
Alliance	0				0.0			
Ecology	0				0.0		174	

== Ward results ==
Contests took place in 19 of the 21 wards.^{(a)}^{(b)}

=== Alexandra (five seats) ===
Alexandra (Penarth) 1983
Party	Candidate	Votes	%	±%
Conservative	A. Ernest *	2,098	34.5	
Conservative	P. Davies	2,003		
Conservative	D. Leddington *	1,993		
Conservative	R. Parsons *	1,715		
Conservative	A. Wicks	1,334		
Alliance	J. Sibert	1,244	20.5	
Alliance	J. Janes	1,008		
Labour	E. Davies	945	15.6	
Ind. Conservative	H. Reynolds *	927	15.3	
Labour	L. Hales	911		
Alliance	E. Hill	911		
Alliance	F. Rattray	899		
Labour	J. Birch	879		
Alliance	P. Dresser	872		
Plaid Cymru	S. Fford	860	14.2	
Labour	C. Couper	847		
Ind. Conservative	T. Waugh *	774		
Plaid Cymru	A. Packer	167		
Plaid Cymru	R. Maccarthy	154		

Counting was not completed overnight and had to be resumed the following day.

=== Baruc (two seats) ===
Baruc (Barry) 1983
Party	Candidate	Votes	%	±%
Conservative	B. D. J. Edmunds *	1,342	49.9	
Conservative	J. Cotter *	1,119		
Alliance	J. Mason	688	25.6	
Labour	E. G. Payne *	659	24.5	

=== Buttrills (two seats) ===
Buttrills (Barry) 1983
Party	Candidate	Votes	%	±%
Conservative	J. Connell	768	37.5	
Labour	D. Lewis	734	35.8	
Labour	C. Hookings	730		
Conservative	J. Mansfield *	588		
Alliance	H. Gosling *	546	26.7	

=== Cadoc (three seats) ===
Cadoc (Barry) 1983
Party	Candidate	Votes	%	±%
Labour	C. T. Price *	1,070	49.0	
Conservative	D. J. Whitchurch	959	43.9	
Labour	R. Brabrook	940		
Labour	M. S. Heffernan	871		
Conservative	A. H. Pugh	819		
Conservative	G. W. R. Elmos	677		
Plaid Cymru	R. Perriam	154	7.1	
Plaid Cymru	C. I. Bere	130		

=== Castleland (two seats) ===
Castleland (Barry) 1983
Party	Candidate	Votes	%	±%
Labour	H. J. Holmes *	843	55.5	
Labour	F. C. Mitchell *	648		
Conservative	M. R. Searle	439	28.9	
Alliance	D. Bennett	237	15.6	

=== Cornerswell (two seats) ===
Cornerswell (Penarth) 1983
Party	Candidate	Votes	%	±%
Conservative	J. L. Flanigan *	1,059	50.0	
Conservative	E. E. LLoyd *	926		
Labour	D. A. Eastwood *	566	26.7	
Labour	M. E. J. Birch	564		
Alliance	E. M. Humphreys	378	17.9	
Alliance	L. Waters	374		
Plaid Cymru	M. Evans	114	5.4	
Plaid Cymru	D. Swaffield	88		

=== Court (two seats) ===
Court (Barry) 1983
Party	Candidate	Votes	%	±%
Labour	C. Dunkley *	893	48.6	
Labour	J. W. Smith *	836		
Conservative	J. E. Coombes	483	26.3	
Conservative	R. Williams	460		
Alliance	Allan Maidment *	391	21.3	
Plaid Cymru	R. Hughes	71	3.9	
Plaid Cymru	S. Biddiscombe	59		

=== Cowbridge (three seats) ===
Cowbridge 1983
Party	Candidate	Votes	%	±%
Conservative	(Ms) C. V. L. Clay	1,290	47.9	
Conservative	J. L. Arnott *	1,270		
Conservative	T. H. Jarvie *	1,074		
Independent	B. A. Gibbon	980	36.4	
Independent	D. C. H. Busher	860		
Alliance	H. M. Davey	423	15.7	
Alliance	J. M. Sutton	327		
Alliance	R. M. Sutton	290		

=== Dinas Powys (four seats) ===
Dinas Powys 1983
Party	Candidate	Votes	%	±%
Plaid Cymru	A. J. Dixon *	1,570	34.8	
Conservative	M. L. Pound *	1,516	33.6	
Conservative	E. G. Davies *	1,511		
Conservative	A. H. Beavan	1,382		
Conservative	A. W. L. Hill	1,269		
Plaid Cymru	M. N. Thomas	1,217		
Plaid Cymru	J. P. Stiff	937		
Plaid Cymru	R. I. Reeves	872		
Alliance	M. J. Adams	808	17.9	
Labour	S. Collins	617	13.7	
Labour	P. Barker	593		
Labour	T. Davies	528		
Labour	J. Morgan	494		

=== Dyfan (two seats) ===
Dyfan (Barry) 1983
Party	Candidate	Votes	%	±%
Conservative	N. G. Martin	813	45.6	
Conservative	B. J. Mepham	745		
Labour	W. M. James *	624	35.0	
Labour	B. W. Hepworth	509		
Alliance	M. C. Bond	346	19.4	
Alliance	D. N. Bond	307		

=== Gibbonsdown (two seats) ===
Gibbonsdown (Barry) 1983
Party	Candidate	Votes	%	±%
Labour	C. Clemo *	939	65.0	
Labour	M. F. Nugent	888		
Conservative	E. G. Butts	505	35.0	
Conservative	A. B. Hopkins	500		

=== Illtyd (three seats) ===
Illtyd (Barry) 1983
Party	Candidate	Votes	%	±%
Conservative	E. T. Williams	1,037	40.3	
Conservative	C. D. Lakin *	1,029		
Conservative	J. R. Griffiths *	960		
Labour	R. M. Dunkley *	936	36.3	
Labour	J. Pett	742		
Alliance	M. Goodyear	603	23.4	
Labour	B. G. Smith	476		

=== Llandough (one seat) ===
Llandough 1983
Party	Candidate	Votes	%	±%
Independent	Derek E. Grenville	323	45.3	
Conservative	Susan Thomas *	320	44.9	
Alliance	C. S. Inker	70	9.8	

Mayor of the Vale of Glamorgan, Susan Thomas, lost by only three votes after three recounts.

=== Llandow (one seat) ===
Llandow 1983
Party	Candidate	Votes	%	±%
Conservative	R. Thomas	Unopposed		

=== Llantwit Major (four seats) ===
Llantwit Major 1983
Party	Candidate	Votes	%	±%
Labour	(Ms) L. S. Hughes *	1,740	51.3	
Conservative	J. George *	1,649	48.7	
Conservative	P. Jones *	1,594		
Conservative	M. F. Casewell	1,209		
Labour	(Ms) J. Pearce	1,201		
Labour	M. Pearce	1,079		
Conservative	R. S. Berry	996		
Labour	S. L. Mills	889		

=== Peterston-super-Ely (one seat) ===
Peterston-super-Ely 1983
Party	Candidate	Votes	%	±%
Conservative	A. J. Williams *	706	69.8	
Ecology	R. M. Baker	174	17.2	
Independent	T. J. Humphries	131	13.0	

=== Rhoose (two seats) ===
Rhoose 1983
Party	Candidate	Votes	%	±%
Conservative	(Ms) H. J. W. James *	1,015	60.2	
Conservative	L. J. Dimond *	943		
Labour	R. V. Goodway	670	39.8	
Labour	H. Germaine	563		

=== St Athan (one seat) ===
St Athan 1983
Party	Candidate	Votes	%	±%
Independent	J. B. Hewartson	553	61.6	
Independent	J. V. James *	345	38.4	

=== Stanwell (two seats) ===
Stanwell (Penarth) 1983
Party	Candidate	Votes	%	±%
Plaid Cymru	R. D. Thomas	897	43.6	
Conservative	A. C. Williams	581	28.2	
Conservative	E. H. Massey	570		
Plaid Cymru	D. B. Haswell	442		
Labour	S. Wolstenholme	394	19.2	
Labour	L. J. Barrett	281		
Alliance	V. Bird	185	9.0	
Alliance	A. Redford	157		

=== Sully (one seat) ===
Sully 1983
Party	Candidate	Votes	%	±%
Conservative	R. C. Sampson	627	77.3	
Plaid Cymru	C. P. Greedy	184	22.7	

=== Wenvoe (one seat) ===
Wenvoe 1983
Party	Candidate	Votes	%	±%
Conservative	R. Davies	Unopposed		

(a) Elections Centre source also compares the percentage vote of the lead candidate for each party in the ward. It indicates (in some wards) which candidates are female.
(b) South Wales Echo source also indicates existing councillors "but, because of boundary changes, not necessarily representing the ward being contested". It gives middle initials. It lists the 'green' candidates as "Ecology" and the 'Liberal/SDP' as "Alliance".

* existing councillor, standing for re-election
