= 2004 Vale of Glamorgan Council election =

2004 Welsh local government election

Results of the 2004 Vale of Glamorgan Council election

The 2004 Vale of Glamorgan Council election took place on Thursday 10 June 2004 to elect members of Vale of Glamorgan Council in Wales. This was the same day as many other local elections in Wales and England. The Conservatives remained the largest party but did not have a majority. The previous full council election was in 1999 and the next full council election was in May 2008.

== Overview ==
Council elections in Wales were originally scheduled for May 2003, but were delayed by a year to avoid a conflict with the 2003 Wales Assembly elections.

Forty-seven seats were up for election in the Vale of Glamorgan. There was an increase in electoral divisions from 22 to 23 following The County Borough of The Vale of Glamorgan (Electoral Changes) Order 2002, which had divided the Alexandra ward into two new wards (and increased the representation in Sully to two councillors). The overall turnout (including spoilt ballots) was 44.4%.

== Election result ==
The Conservative Party remained the largest party following the election, though did not have a majority.

Vale of Glamorgan Council election 2004
Party	Seats	Gains	Losses	Net gain/loss	Seats %	Votes %	Votes	+/−
Conservative	20			-2	42.5			
Labour	16			-2	34.0			
Plaid Cymru	8			+2	17.0			
Independent	3			+3	6.3			
Liberal Democrats	0			-1	0.0			
Liberal	0	0	0	0	0.0			
Green	0	0	0	0	0.0			

== Ward results ==
Ward	Political group	Councillor	Change from 1999 election
Baruc (Barry)	Plaid Cymru	Nicolas Hodges	Plaid Cymru hold
Baruc (Barry)	Plaid Cymru	Steffan Wiliam	Plaid Cymru hold
Buttrills (Barry)	Labour	Margaret Alexander	Labour hold
Buttrills (Barry)	Labour	Stuart Egan	Labour hold
Cadoc (Barry)	Labour	Josephine Moore	Labour hold
Cadoc (Barry)	Labour	Frederick Johnson	Labour hold
Cadoc (Barry)	Labour	Neil Moore	Labour hold
Castleland (Barry)	Plaid Cymru	Barry Shaw	Plaid Cymru gain from Labour
Castleland (Barry)	Plaid Cymru	Keith Stockdale	Plaid Cymru gain from Labour
Cornerswell (Penarth)	Labour	Rhiannon Birch	Labour gain from Conservative
Cornerswell (Penarth)	Labour	Nigel Gibbs	Labour hold
Court (Barry)	Labour	Richard Bertin	Labour hold
Court (Barry)	Labour	Andrew Dobbinson	Labour hold
Cowbridge	Conservative	Catherine Clay	Conservative hold
Cowbridge	Conservative	Geoffrey Cox	Conservative hold
Cowbridge	Conservative	Thomas Jarvie	Conservative hold
Dinas Powys	Plaid Cymru	Christopher Franks	Plaid Cymru hold
Dinas Powys	Plaid Cymru	Val Hartrey	Plaid Cymru hold
Dinas Powys	Plaid Cymru	Margaret Randall	Plaid Cymru hold
Dinas Powys	Plaid Cymru	Christopher Williams	Plaid Cymru hold
Dyfan (Barry)	Conservative	Anthony Powell	Labour hold
Dyfan (Barry)	Conservative	Jennifer Cole	Labour hold
Gibbonsdown (Barry)	Labour	Rob Curtis	Labour hold
Gibbonsdown (Barry)	Labour	Margaret Wilkinson	Labour hold
Illtyd (Barry)	Conservative	Terry Hampton	Conservative hold
Illtyd (Barry)	Conservative	Emlyn Williams	Conservative hold
Illtyd (Barry)	Conservative	Janice Charles	Conservative hold
Llandough	Conservative	Colin Osborne	Conservative gain from Labour
Llandow and Ewenny	Conservative	William Vaughan	Conservative hold
Llantwit Major	Independent	Gwyn John	Independent gain from Conservative
Llantwit Major	Independent	Eric Hacker	Independent gain from Conservative
Llantwit Major	Independent	Alfred Readman	Independent gain from Conservative
Llantwit Major	Conservative	John Clifford	Conservative hold
Peterston-Super-Ely	Conservative	Anthony Williams	Conservative hold
Plymouth (Penarth)	Conservative	Maureen Kelly-Owen	Conservative win (new seat)
Plymouth (Penarth)	Conservative	Alfred Williams	Conservative win (new seat)
Rhoose	Conservative	Haydn James	Conservative hold
Rhoose	Conservative	Gordon Kemp	Conservative hold
St Athan	Conservative	John Thomas	Conservative hold
St Augustine's (Penarth)	Labour	Elisabeth Burnett	Labour win (new seat)
St Augustine's (Penarth)	Conservative	Paul Church	Conservative win (new seat)
St Brides Major	Conservative	Audrey Preston	Conservative hold
Stanwell (Penarth)	Labour	Mary Birch	Labour hold
Stanwell (Penarth)	Labour	Mark Wilson	Labour hold
Sully	Conservative	Anthony Ernest	Conservative hold
Sully	Conservative	Sarah Sharpe	Conservative win (new seat)
Wenvoe	Conservative	Michael Harvey	Conservative hold
