= Mark Hooper (politician) =

Welsh businessman and politician (born 1969)

Mark Hooper MS
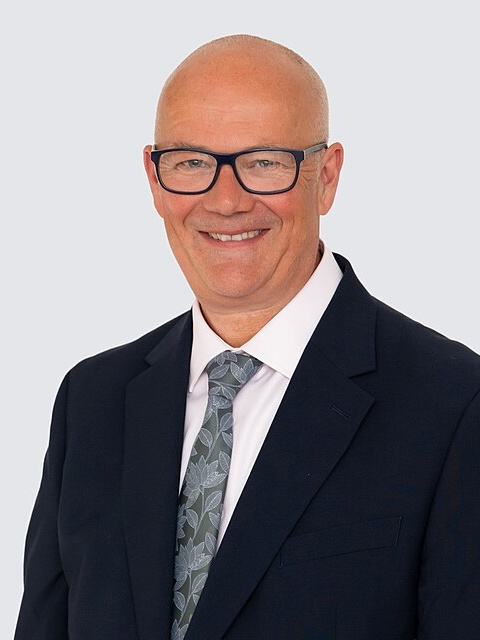
- Official portrait, 2026

Deputy Minister for Transport
- Incumbent
- Assumed office 13 May 2026
- First Minister: Rhun ap Iorwerth
- Preceded by: Ken Skates

Member of the Senedd
- Incumbent
- Assumed office 8 May 2026
- Constituency: Pen-y-bont Bro Morgannwg

Vale of Glamorgan Councillor for Baruc ward
- Incumbent
- Assumed office 5 May 2022
- Preceded by: Seat added

Personal details
- Party: Plaid Cymru (2016 - present)
- Other political affiliations: Welsh Liberal Democrats (previously)

Mark Jonathan Hooper (born May 1969) is a Welsh Plaid Cymru politician and businessman, who has served as a Member of the Senedd (MS) for Pen-y-bont Bro Morgannwg since 2026. He has served as a councillor for Baruc ward on Vale of Glamorgan Council since May 2022. Previously, he served as a councillor for the Buttrills ward on Barry Town Council from 2017 to 2022.

== Professional career ==
In 2016, Hooper founded IndyCube, a community interest company that operates coworking spaces in Wales.

Hooper is involved in the project to create Banc Cambria, a proposed community bank for Wales that was a policy pursued by Mark Drakeford, serving as a member of the organisation's board. Hooper worked as a part-time special advisor to the Welsh Government from 25 September 2023 to Drakeford's resignation in March 2024.

Hooper also works for Community Energy Wales as their Business Development Manager.

== Political career ==
Hooper ran twice for elected office with the Welsh Liberal Democrats, once at the 2005 general election to represent the Vale of Glamorgan in the UK Parliament, and again at the 2007 Welsh Assembly election, again to represent the Vale of Glamorgan.

In 2016, Hooper joined Plaid Cymru, citing a belief that the politics of Wales was not responsive to the needs of Wales.

In 2017, Hooper was elected to represent the Buttrills ward on Barry Town Council. He did not contest the Town council at the 2022 elections, instead being elected as Vale of Glamorgan Councillor for Baruc ward in Barry.

In 2020, Hooper stood for election to the Central Committee of YesCymru. He did not stand for re-election in 2021.

In 2025, Hooper contested selection for the Pen-y-bont Bro Morgannwg constituency. He won the selection, demoting incumbent and Plaid Cymru Economy and Energy spokesperson Luke Fletcher to third place on Plaid Cymru's candidate list, due to Plaid Cymru's usage of gender-alternating lists, to ensure gender parity. He was elected, being the first candidate to receive a seat, after Plaid Cymru received the largest number of votes in the constituency.

In the 2026 Senedd election, Hooper was elected as a MS, representing the Pen-y-bont Bro Morgannwg constituency.
