= Vale of Glamorgan (UK Parliament constituency) =

UK Parliament constituency (since 1983)

Coordinates: 51.429°N 3.351°W

- County constituency for the House of Commons
- Interactive map of the constituency.
- Location of the constituency within Wales
- Preserved county: South Glamorgan
- Electorate: 74,374 (July 2024)
- Major settlements: Barry, Llantwit Major, Cowbridge

Current constituency
- Created: 1983
- Member of Parliament: Kanishka Narayan (Labour)
- Seats: One
- Created from: Barry and Pontypridd

Overlaps
- Senedd: Pen-y-bont Bro Morgannwg

Vale of Glamorgan (Welsh: Bro Morgannwg) is a constituency (Note: A borough constituency (for the purposes of election expenses and type of returning officer)) represented in the House of Commons of the UK Parliament since 2024 by Kanishka Narayan, a Labour MP. (Note: As with all constituencies, the constituency elects one Member of Parliament (MP) by the first past the post system of election at least every five years.)

The constituency retained its name but its boundaries were altered as part of the 2023 review of Westminster constituencies and under the June 2023 final recommendations of the Boundary Commission for Wales for the 2024 general election.

== Boundaries ==
1983–2010: The Borough of Vale of Glamorgan wards of Baruc, Buttrills, Cadoc, Castleland, Court, Cowbridge, Dinas Powys, Dyfan, Gibbonsdown, Illtyd, Llandow, Llantwit Major, Peterson-super-Ely, Rhoose, St Athan, Sully, and Wenvoe.

2010–2024: The Vale of Glamorgan County Borough electoral divisions of Baruc, Buttrills, Cadoc, Castleland, Court, Cowbridge, Dinas Powys, Dyfan, Gibbonsdown, Illtyd, Llandow and Ewenny, Llantwit Major, Peterston-super-Ely, Rhoose, St Athan, St Bride's Major, and Wenvoe. Sully ward was transferred to Cardiff South and Penarth in 2010.

2024–present: As a result of the 2023 boundary review, Dinas Powys was transferred to Cardiff South and Penarth, representing 8.3% of its size.

Following a local government boundary review which came into effect in May 2022, the constituency now comprises the following wards of the Vale of Glamorgan County Borough from the 2024 general election:

- Baruc, Buttrills, Cadoc, Castleland, Court, Cowbridge, Dyfan, Gibbonsdown, Illtyd, Llandow, Llantwit Major, Peterston-super-Ely, Rhoose, St Athan, St Bride's Major, St Nicholas and Llancarfan, and Wenvoe.

== History ==
This marginal constituency to the west of Cardiff takes in the Labour-voting seaside resort of Barry and a number of Conservative villages and small towns, such as Cowbridge. It is a bellwether constituency, having been won by the party with a plurality of seats in every general election since the seat was created in 1983, although Labour won a by-election in 1989 during the Major ministry of 1987-1992. There have been some close shaves for both parties here in the past: Conservative Walter Sweeney got home by a mere 19 votes in 1992; and John Smith had a majority of under 2,000 in 2005. Smith stood down from Parliament due to ill health for the 2010 election, and the seat went to Conservative Alun Cairns, who served as Secretary of State for Wales from 2016 to 2019. In 2024, the constituency swung back to Labour in line with the national election result.

== Members of Parliament ==
Election	Member	Party
1983	Sir Raymond Gower	Conservative
1989 by-election	John Smith	Labour
1992	Walter Sweeney	Conservative
1997	John Smith	Labour
2010	Alun Cairns	Conservative
2024	Kanishka Narayan	Labour

== Elections ==
=== Elections in the 2020s ===
General election 2024: Vale of Glamorgan
Party	Candidate	Votes	%	±%
Labour	Kanishka Narayan	17,740	38.7	−5.2
Conservative	Alun Cairns	13,524	29.5	−19.6
Reform	Toby Rhodes-Matthews	6,973	15.2	N/A
Plaid Cymru	Ian James Johnson	3,245	7.1	N/A
Green	Lynden Mack	1,881	4.1	−1.9
Liberal Democrats	Steven Rajam	1,612	3.5	N/A
Abolish	Stuart Field	669	1.5	N/A
Independent	Steven Sluman	182	0.4	N/A
Majority		4,216	9.2	N/A
Turnout		45,826	61.6	−9.4
Registered electors		74,374		
Labour gain from Conservative		Swing	▲7.2	

=== Elections in the 2010s ===
2019 notional result (Note: Estimate of the 2019 general election result as if the revised boundaries recommended under the 2023 boundary review were in place)
Party	Vote	%
Conservative	24,535	49.1
Labour	21,969	43.9
Green Party	2,981	6.0
Gwlad Gwlad	508	1.0
Majority	2,566	5.1
Turnout	49,993	71.0
Electorate	70,426	

General election 2019: Vale of Glamorgan
Party	Candidate	Votes	%	±%
Conservative	Alun Cairns	27,305	49.8	+2.3
Labour	Belinda Loveluck-Edwards	23,743	43.3	−0.1
Green	Anthony Slaughter	3,251	5.9	+5.1
Gwlad Gwlad	Laurence Williams	508	0.9	N/A
Rejected ballots		294		
Majority		3,562	6.5	+2.4
Turnout		54,807	71.6	−1.0
Registered electors		76,508		
Conservative hold		Swing	+1.2	

Of the 294 rejected ballots:

- 255 were either unmarked or it was uncertain who the vote was for.
- 37 voted for more than one candidate.
- 2 had writing or mark by which the voter could be identified.

General election 2017: Vale of Glamorgan
Party	Candidate	Votes	%	±%
Conservative	Alun Cairns	25,501	47.5	+1.5
Labour	Camilla Beaven	23,311	43.4	+10.8
Plaid Cymru	Ian Johnson	2,295	4.3	−1.3
Liberal Democrats	Jennifer Geroni	1,020	1.9	−0.7
UKIP	Melanie Hunter-Clarke	868	1.8	−8.1
Green	Stephen Davis-Barker	419	0.8	−1.3
Women's Equality	Sharon Lovell	177	0.3	N/A
Pirate	David Elston	127	0.2	N/A
Majority		2,190	4.1	−9.3
Turnout		53,718	72.6	+1.5
Registered electors		73,959		
Conservative hold		Swing	−4.6	

General election 2015: Vale of Glamorgan
Party	Candidate	Votes	%	±%
Conservative	Alun Cairns	23,607	46.0	+4.2
Labour	Chris Elmore	16,727	32.6	−0.3
UKIP	Kevin Mahoney	5,489	10.7	+7.6
Plaid Cymru	Ian Johnson	2,869	5.6	+0.1
Liberal Democrats	David Morgan	1,309	2.6	−12.6
Green	Alan Armstrong	1,054	2.1	+1.2
CISTA	Steve Reed	238	0.5	N/A
Majority		6,880	13.4	+4.5
Turnout		51,293	71.1	+1.8
Registered electors		72,794		
Conservative hold		Swing	+2.3	

General election 2010: Vale of Glamorgan
Party	Candidate	Votes	%	±%
Conservative	Alun Cairns	20,341	41.8	+4.4
Labour	Alana E. Davies	16,034	32.9	−7.8
Liberal Democrats	Eluned Parrott	7,403	15.2	+2.0
Plaid Cymru	Ian Johnson	2,667	5.5	+0.4
UKIP	Kevin Mahoney	1,529	3.1	+1.4
Green	Rhodri H. Thomas	457	0.9	N/A
Christian	John Harrold	236	0.5	N/A
Majority		4,307	8.9	N/A
Turnout		48,667	69.3	+0.7
Registered electors		70,211		
Conservative gain from Labour		Swing	+6.1	

=== Elections in the 2000s ===
General election 2005: Vale of Glamorgan
Party	Candidate	Votes	%	±%
Labour	John Smith	19,481	41.2	−4.2
Conservative	Alun Cairns	17,673	37.3	+2.3
Liberal Democrats	Mark Hooper	6,140	13.0	+0.8
Plaid Cymru	Barry Shaw	2,423	5.1	−1.2
UKIP	Richard Suchorzewski	840	1.8	+0.8
Liberal	Karl-James Langford	605	1.3	N/A
Socialist Labour	Paul Mules	162	0.3	N/A
Majority		1,808	3.9	−6.5
Turnout		47,324	68.9	+2.2
Registered electors		68,657		
Labour hold		Swing	−3.3	

General election 2001: Vale of Glamorgan
Party	Candidate	Votes	%	±%
Labour	John Smith	20,524	45.4	−8.5
Conservative	Susan Inkin	15,824	35.0	+0.6
Liberal Democrats	Dewi Smith	5,521	12.2	+3.0
Plaid Cymru	Chris Franks	2,867	6.3	+3.7
UKIP	Timothy Warry	448	1.0	N/A
Majority		4,700	10.4	−9.1
Turnout		45,184	66.7	−13.3
Registered electors		67,774		
Labour hold		Swing	−4.6	

=== Elections in the 1990s ===
General election 1997: Vale of Glamorgan
Party	Candidate	Votes	%	±%
Labour	John Smith	29,054	53.9	+9.6
Conservative	Walter Sweeney	18,522	34.4	−9.9
Liberal Democrats	Suzanne Campbell	4,945	9.2	±0.0
Plaid Cymru	Melanie Corp	1,393	2.6	+0.5
Majority		10,532	19.5	N/A
Turnout		53,914	80.0	−1.9
Registered electors		67,413		
Labour gain from Conservative		Swing	−9.8	

General election 1992: Vale of Glamorgan
Party	Candidate	Votes	%	±%
Conservative	Walter Sweeney	24,220	44.3	−2.5
Labour	John Smith	24,201	44.3	+9.6
Liberal Democrats	David Davies	5,045	9.2	−7.5
Plaid Cymru	David Haswell	1,160	2.1	+0.3
Majority		19	0.0	−12.1
Turnout		54,626	81.9	+2.6
Registered electors		66,672		
Conservative hold		Swing		

=== Elections in the 1980s ===
1989 Vale of Glamorgan by-election
Party	Candidate	Votes	%	±%
Labour	John Smith	23,342	48.9	+14.2
Conservative	Rod Richards	17,314	36.3	−10.5
SLD	Frank Leavers	2,017	4.2	−12.5
Plaid Cymru	John Dixon	1,672	3.5	+1.7
SDP	David Keith Davies	1,098	2.3	N/A
Green	Marilyn Wakefield	971	2.0	N/A
Protect the Health Service	Christopher Tiarks	847	1.8	N/A
Monster Raving Loony	Screaming Lord Sutch	266	0.5	N/A
Independent Welsh Socialist	Eric Roberts	148	0.3	N/A
Corrective Party	Lindi St Claire	39	0.1	N/A
Christian Alliance	David Black	32	0.1	N/A
Majority		6,028	12.6	N/A
Turnout		47,746	70.7	−8.6
Registered electors		67,549		
Labour gain from Conservative		Swing	−12.4	

General election 1987: Vale of Glamorgan
Party	Candidate	Votes	%	±%
Conservative	Raymond Gower	24,229	46.8	−1.2
Labour	John Smith	17,978	34.7	+8.9
SDP	David Davies	8,633	16.7	−7.2
Plaid Cymru	Penri Williams	946	1.8	−0.5
Majority		6,251	12.1	−10.1
Turnout		51,786	79.3	+5.1
Registered electors		65,310		
Conservative hold		Swing	−5.1	

General election 1983: Vale of Glamorgan
Party	Candidate	Votes	%	±%
Conservative	Raymond Gower	22,241	48.0	
Labour	Michael Sharp	12,028	25.8	
SDP	William Evans	11,154	23.9	
Plaid Cymru	John Dixon	1,068	2.3	
Majority		10,393	22.2	
Turnout		46,671	74.2	
Registered electors		62,885		
Conservative win (new seat)				

== See also ==
- Vale of Glamorgan (Senedd constituency)
- List of parliamentary constituencies in South Glamorgan
- List of parliamentary constituencies in Wales
