= St Brides Major =

Village in the Vale of Glamorgan, Wales

Coordinates: 51.4633°N 3.5931°W

St. Brides Major: Welsh: Sant-y-brid
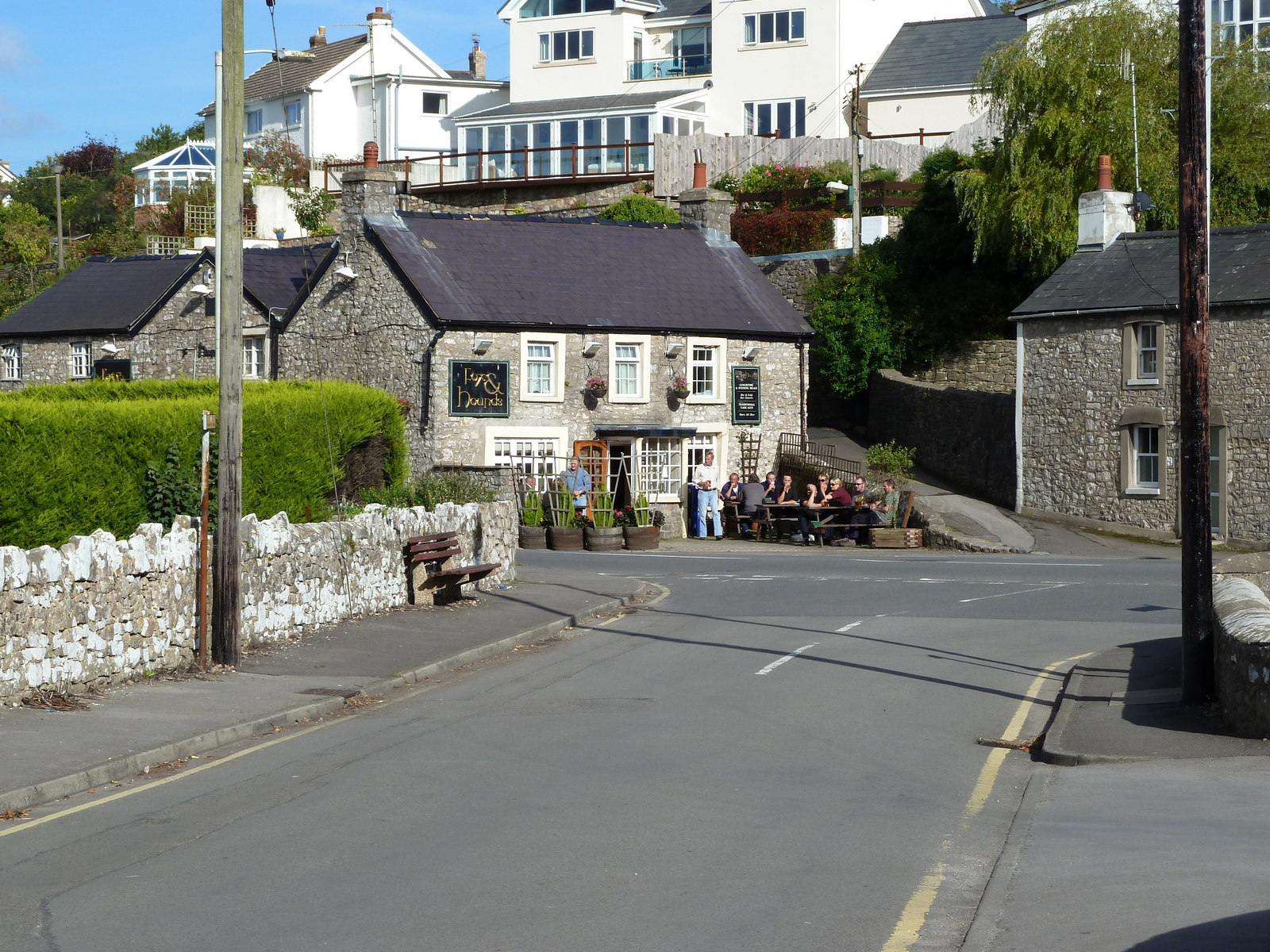
- Fox and Hounds pub, St. Bride's Major

- Location within the Vale of Glamorgan
- Population: 1,940
- OS grid reference: SS894750
- Principal area: Vale of Glamorgan
- Preserved county: South Glamorgan
- Country: Wales
- Sovereign state: United Kingdom
- Post town: BRIDGEND
- Postcode district: CF32 0
- Police: South Wales
- Fire: South Wales
- Ambulance: Welsh
- UK Parliament: Vale of Glamorgan
- Senedd Cymru – Welsh Parliament: Vale of Glamorgan

St. Brides Major (Welsh: Sant-y-brid) is a village within the community also called St Brides Major in the Vale of Glamorgan in Wales.

The village is located approximately 1.5 mi from the Glamorgan Heritage Coast. It is connected by bus to the nearby towns Llantwit Major and Bridgend 3 miles (5 km)).

== Notable buildings ==
The village is the location of St. Bridget's church, the Fox & Hounds and the Farmer's Arms pubs, Pitcot Pool and St. Brides Primary School.

The 12th-century Church of St Bridget is now in the combined Parish of Ewenny and St Brides Major, within the Diocese of Llandaff. For much of its history it was a Parish in its own right, co-inciding with the civil parish and more recently community boundaries. Until the Reformation the Church was, along with Ewenny Priory and other local churches, a possession of Gloucester Abbey, both having been given to the abbey in 1141. It contains a number of medieval tombs and memorials, but the building itself was heavily restored by Egbert Moxham in 1851.

There were two non-conformist Chapels within St Brides Major village. Bryn Sion Calvinistic Methodist Chapel, Penylan Road, was built in 1859, replacing a building of 1824. It closed in 1987 and is now a house. Horeb Baptist Church, Ewenny Road, was built in 1863 and closed in 2003. The building was sympathetically restored during 2019 and is now a hairdressers and beauty clinic.

== Electoral ward ==
St Brides Major was transferred from the Borough of Ogwr to the Vale of Glamorgan on 1 April 1996. St Brides Major became an electoral ward to the Vale of Glamorgan Council, electing one county councillor. The ward also includes the community of Wick.

At the first 1995 elections, the ward elected a Labour Party councillor, though at subsequent elections it elected a Conservative representative.

Prior to 1996 St Brides Major was a ward to Mid Glamorgan County Council and Ogwr Borough Council.
