= Cadoxton railway station =

Railway station in the Vale of Glamorgan, Wales

Cadoxton Welsh: Tregatwg
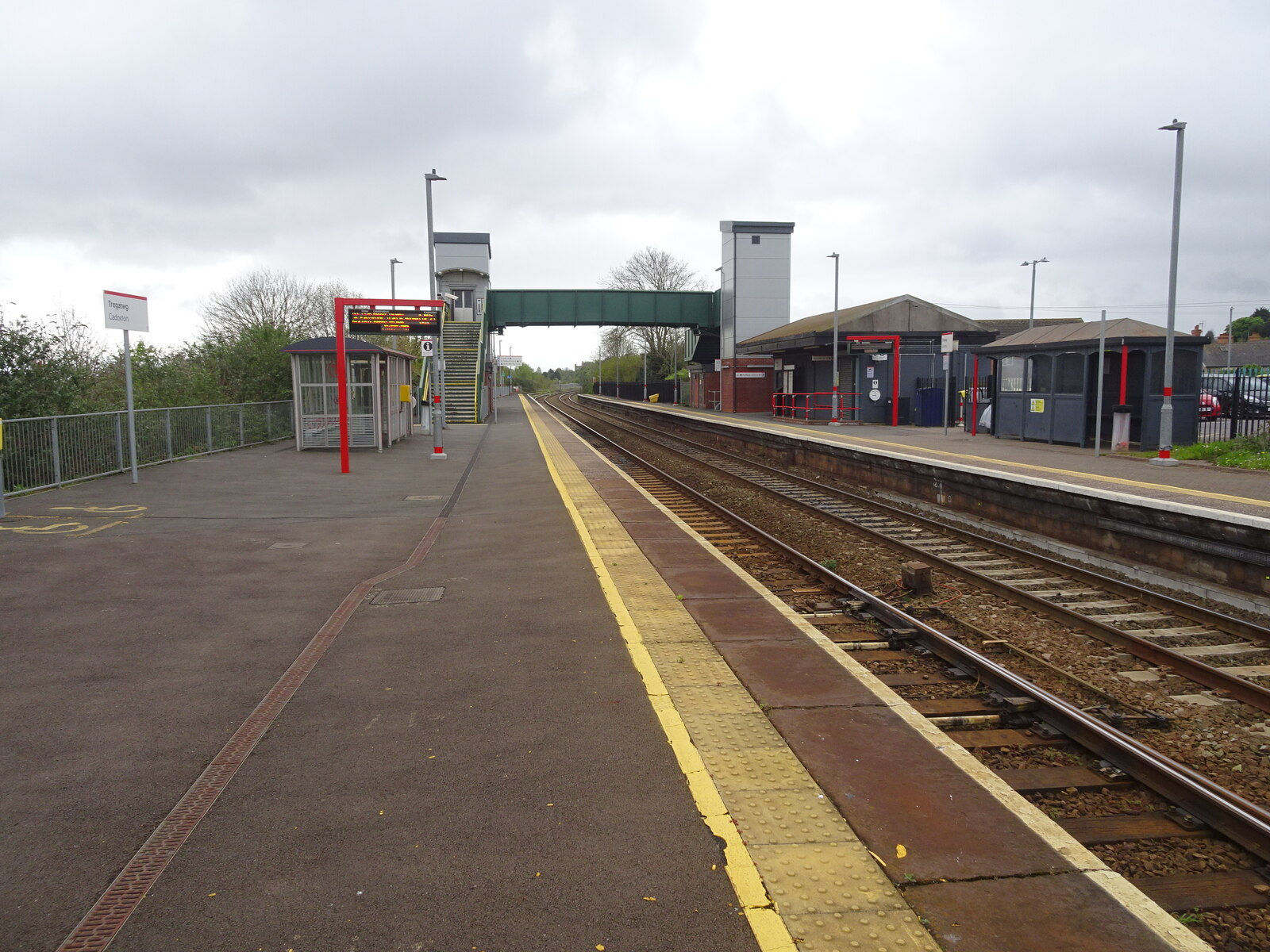
- Cadoxton railway station in 2024

General information
- Location: Cadoxton, Vale of Glamorgan; Wales
- Coordinates: 51°24′44″N 3°14′55″W
- Grid reference: ST132688
- Managed by: Transport for Wales
- Platforms: 2

Other information
- Station code: CAD
- Classification: DfT category E

History
- Opened: 20 December 1888

Passengers
- 2020/21: ▼75,100
- 2021/22: ▲0.205 million
- 2022/23: ▲0.258 million
- 2023/24: ▲0.298 million
- 2024/25: ▲0.323 million
Location
Notes
- Passenger statistics from the Office of Rail and Road

Cadoxton railway station is a railway station serving Cadoxton and Palmerstown near Barry, Vale of Glamorgan, South Wales. It is located on the Barry Branch 6½ miles (10 km) south of Cardiff Central. The line continues to the terminus of the Barry Branch at Barry Island but from Barry Junction the line also continues as the Vale of Glamorgan branch to Bridgend via Rhoose for Cardiff International Airport bus link and then Llantwit Major.

As of October 2018, passenger services are operated by Transport for Wales as part of the Valley Lines network.

== History ==
The station here was built and opened by the Barry Railway in December 1888 and just east of the station, the Barry Railway Company's main line from Cadoxton South Junction via Wenvoe to Trehafod Junction in the Rhondda Valley ran and was opened in 1889. It was very busy from the outset and later with Biglis Junction a short distance to the north-east, the former Taff Vale Railway's coastal Penarth branch from Cogan Junction joined the Barry Company's Cadoxton-Cogan Junction extension towards what was Cardiff General up to 1964, subsequently changed to Cardiff Central. This network thus served the then newly commissioned, rail-served Barry Docks complex. A major yard at Cadoxton North (with 39 sidings) north of Cadoxton South Junction was built in the early 1890s to handle the large numbers of coal trains brought down to the docks for coal export and the community of Cadoxton soon grew substantially to house the railway workers employed there, which in turn led to increasing levels of passenger traffic using the station. The arrival of the Taff Vale Railway's coastal route from Penarth via Lavernock in 1890, the completion of the branch to Barry Island in 1896 and the opening of the Vale of Glamorgan Line two years after that, added even greater volumes of both passengers (mainly day-trippers but often holidaymakers to the resort at Barry Island) and goods passing through - by 1910 the docks had surpassed neighbouring Cardiff's as the busiest in South Wales for coal exports and subsequently became the biggest coal export dock (in terms of volume) in the world by 1913.

The majority of passenger services ran to/from Cardiff (either via the coast and Penarth or directly via Dinas Powys) but the line via the Wenvoe Tunnel was used by trains to and from Porth via Pontypridd Graig from 1896 onwards and the VoG line had a passenger service to/from Bridgend from its opening in 1898 until closure in 1964. Service frequencies were kept relatively low on the Wenvoe line however in order to accommodate the high volumes of freight, with six trains per day each way the standard frequency (except on summer Saturdays) for many years.

Traffic levels declined significantly after World War II, with road competition leading to a significant drop in usage on all of the routes serving the station, especially in the summer months. This led to British Railways closing many of the routes to passengers in the 1960s - the Pontypridd line was the first to go in September 1962, whilst the Vale of Glamorgan (June 1964) and Penarth (May 1968) lines both fell victim to the Beeching Axe, leaving only the Cardiff to Barry Island line still open. Of the three that lost their passenger trains, (Cadoxton-Pontypridd, Barry-Bridgend and Penarth-Cadoxton), only the Cardiff-Barry Island and Cardiff-Bridgend via Llantwit Major (reopened in June 2005)) services remain, with many through trains from Valley termini, such as Aberdare, Treherbert, Merthyr and Rhymney. Cadoxton-Pontypridd (via Treforest Junction) and Penarth-Cadoxton were closed completely and the tracks lifted by 1970. The yard also suffered a similar fate, with the sidings dismantled after the abandonment of the Wenvoe 'main line' in March 1963 and the site subsequently redeveloped for housing. The decline in routes serving the station has had a consequent effect on the layout here, with only two of the four original platforms now in use.

Some freight traffic bound for the remaining rail-connected parts of the docks still passes through (such as containers & scrap steel) along with that heading further west (e.g. automotive parts for the Ford factory at Bridgend and bulk coal bound for Aberthaw Power Station), but many of the flows that once ran to the docks have now ceased (such as the ICI chemical tank trains from Burn Naze and Baglan Bay which ended in the late 1990s). By October 2019, it was apparent that coal deliveries to Aberthaw "B" power station had ceased and it had been announced that the Power station was to close in the spring of 2020. The Ford factory at Bridgend was also to close in 2020 but on a better note, there had been some considerable flow of cement delivery by rail from Tarmac's Aberthaw cement works during 2018 and 2019.

== Facilities ==
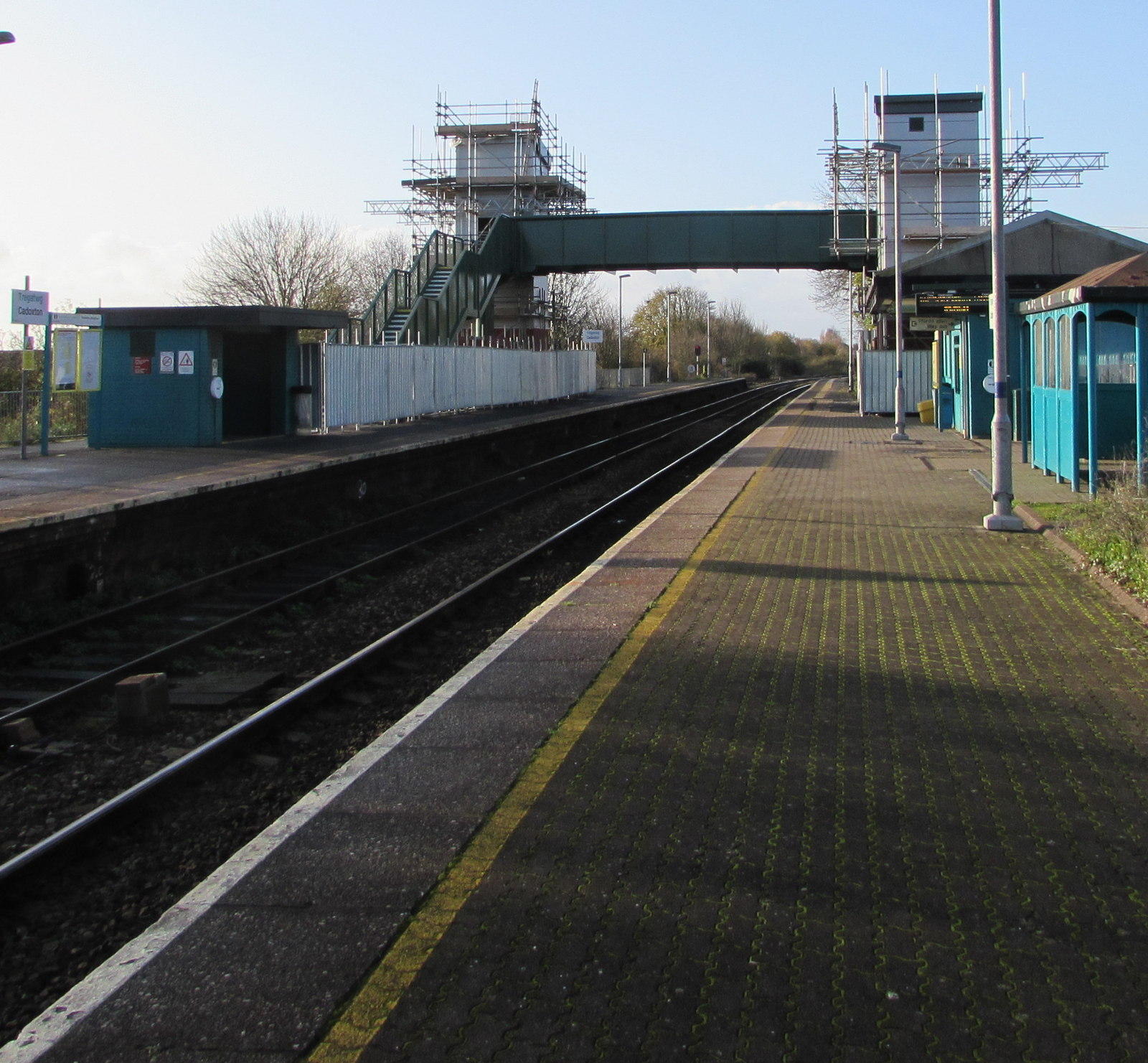
Footbridge under construction (November 2019)

The station has a small "drop off and pick up only" car park in Station Approach. The current ticket office in the station building is open six days per week. A self-service ticket machine is provided for use outside these times and for collecting pre-paid tickets. Train running information is offered via digital CIS displays and timetable poster boards.

By the summer of 2019, Network Rail was installing a new footbridge with accessible lifts to both platforms and this was nearing completion by October 2019. It was funded through UK Government's ‘Access for All’ programme, with match funding from Welsh Government.

The new footbridge and lifts for both platforms opened in August 2020. The station redevelopment also included a new waiting shelter on platform two, widening the doorways in and out of the ticket office and the installation of tactile paving on the platform edge. A new ramp was also constructed leading out of the ticket office onto platform one.

== Services ==
Monday to Saturday daytimes there is a 15-minute frequency. Northbound there are 4 trains to Cardiff Central and beyond (2tph to Bargoed and 2tph to Rhymney). Southbound there are 3 trains per hour to Barry Island and an hourly service to Bridgend via Rhoose.

Monday to Saturday services

- 2tph from Barry Island to Bargoed
- 1tph from Barry Island to Rhymney
- 1tph from Bridgend to Rhymeny
- 2tph from Bargoed to Barry Island
- 1tph from Rhymney to Barry Island
- 1tph from Rhymney to Bridgend

Evenings and Sundays there is a generally a half-hourly service to Cardiff Central. In the evenings there is an hourly service southbound to Barry Island and Bridgend whilst on Sundays, it is half-hourly to Barry Island and every two hours to Bridgend.

Sunday services

- 1tph from Barry Island to Rhymney
- 1tph from Barry Island to Caerphilly
- 1tp2h from Bridgend to Cardiff Central
- 1tph from Rhymney to Barry Island
- 1tph from Caerphilly to Barry Island
- 1tp2h from Cardiff Central to Bridgend

Preceding station	National Rail	Following station
Dinas Powys	Transport for Wales; Vale Line	Barry Docks
	Disused railways	
Wenvoe; Line and station closed	Barry Railway; Porth-Barry	Barry Docks; Line and station open
Terminus	Great Western Railway; Taff Vale	Sully; Line and station closed
