= Alexandra (Penarth electoral ward) =

Former electoral ward of the Vale of Glamorgan, Wales

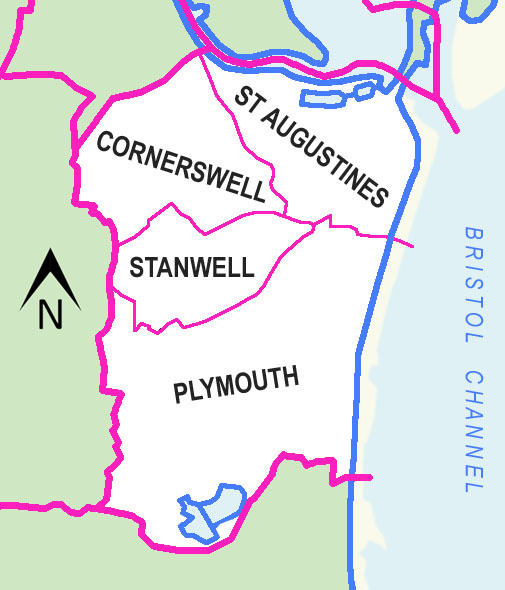
Post-2004 county electoral wards in Penarth. Alexandra became Plymouth and St Augustine's, which had previously been community wards

Alexandra was an electoral ward in Penarth, Vale of Glamorgan, Wales. It elected county councillors to the Vale of Glamorgan Council at the 1995 and 1999 local elections.

The Alexandra ward covered a large area of Penarth including the town centre and the more affluent southern part. Five county councillors were elected from the ward to the Vale of Glamorgan Council. For elections to Penarth Town Council it was divided into the Plymouth and St Augustine's community wards.

== 1983–1996 ==
The ward elected councillors to the Vale of Glamorgan Borough Council from 1983. Five Conservative councillors were elected at the 1983, 1987 and 1991 elections.

1983 Vale of Glamorgan Borough Council election
Party	Candidate	Votes	%	±%
Conservative	A. Ernest *	2,098		
Conservative	P. Davies	2,003		
Conservative	D. Leddington *	1,993		
Conservative	R. Parsons *	1,715		
Conservative	A. Wicks	1,334		
Alliance	J. Sibert	1,244		
Alliance	J. Janes	1,008		
Labour	E. Davies	945		
Ind. Conservative	H. Reynolds *	927		
Labour	L. Hales	911		
Alliance	E. Hill	911		
Alliance	F. Rattray	899		
Labour	J. Birch	879		
Alliance	P. Dresser	872		
Plaid Cymru	S. Fford	860		
Labour	C. Couper	847		
Ind. Conservative	T. Waugh *	774		
Plaid Cymru	A. Packer	167		
Plaid Cymru	R. Maccarthy	154		

* existing councillor, standing for re-election

== Post-1996 ==
At the 1995 county elections to the new Vale of Glamorgan Council unitary authority, Alexandra elected five Labour Party councillors, in what the South Wales Echo described as a "rout". There were no Conservative councillors left in Penarth.

1995 Vale of Glamorgan Council election
Party	Candidate	Votes	%	±%
Labour	(Ms) L. J. Barrett	2,059		
Labour	J. Birch	1,848		
Labour	P. Gray	1,847		
Labour	(Ms) G. Emmerson	1,732		
Labour	N. Fogg	1,649		
Conservative	A. Ernest ^{o}	1,580		
Conservative	A. Wickes ^{o}	1,357		
Conservative	C. Osborne ^{o}	1,348		
Conservative	(Ms) D. Turner	1,334		
Independent	M. Cranfield-Adams	1,300		
Conservative	A. Williams ^{o}	1,282		
Plaid Cymru	D. Harries	544		
Plaid Cymru	(Ms) M. Harries	515		

^{o} existing councillor, elected in 1991 to the VoG borough council, standing for re-election

At the following 1999 elections, four of the five seats were won back by the Conservative Party.

Following The County Borough of The Vale of Glamorgan (Electoral Changes) Order 2002 Alexandra was divided into two, with the existing town wards of Plymouth and St Augustine's becoming county wards electing two councillors each to the county council. The change was effective from October 2003 for preliminary electoral proceedings but fully effective at the May 2004 Vale of Glamorgan Council elections.

In 2017 town councillors asked South Wales Police why they were still using the Alexandra ward as an area of Penarth for their crime statistics. The police blamed this on an overseas software update.
