= Cadoxton, Vale of Glamorgan =

Cadoxton Tregatwg
- District of Barry

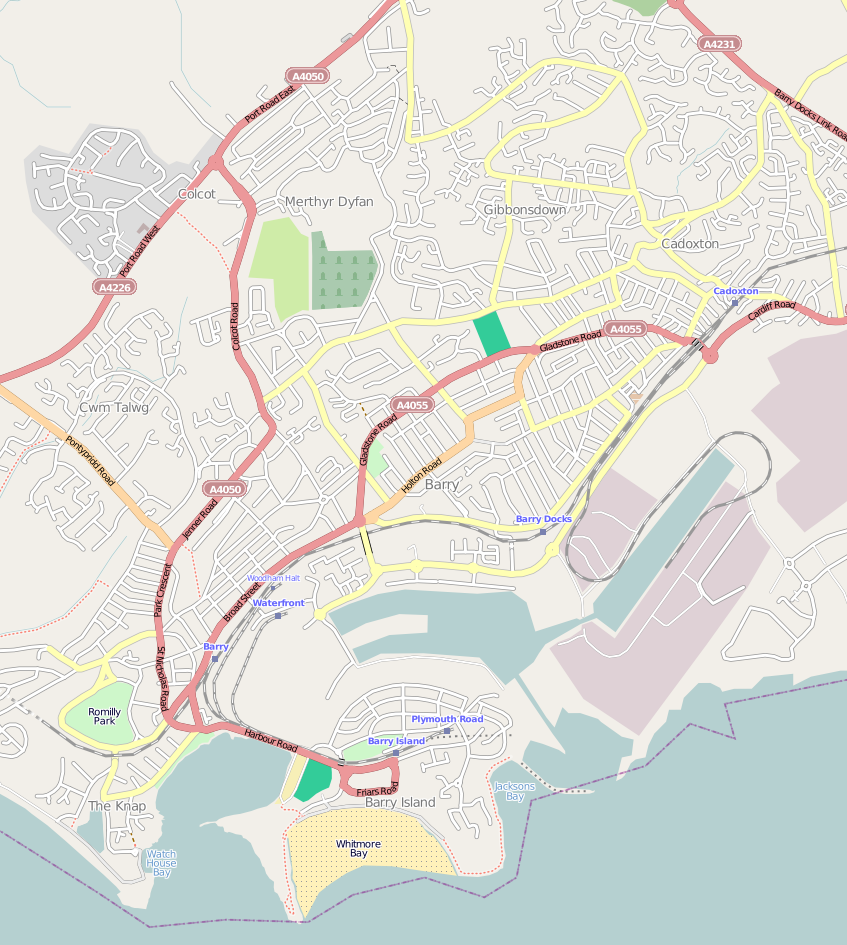
- Location in Barry
- Coordinates: 51°25′12″N 3°15′0″W
- Country: United Kingdom
- Region: Wales
- County: Vale of Glamorgan
- Town: Barry
- Time zone: UTC+0 (GMT)

Cadoxton (/ˈkædəkstən/; Welsh: Tregatwg) is a district of Barry in the Vale of Glamorgan, Wales. Cadoxton was once originally its own village, separate from Barry. It grew up around Saint Cadoc's parish church, which survives. It is also home to Cadoxton Primary School, situated opposite Victoria Park which in turn is opposite Crystal Springs Conservation Group. The Group was founded in 2005 and campaigned to save the field from housing. Cadoxton Nursery is located beside the primary school.

The area is served by Cadoxton railway station.

== History ==
Over the years remains have been found that suggest Cadoxton, (under a different name), was once a Roman settlement.

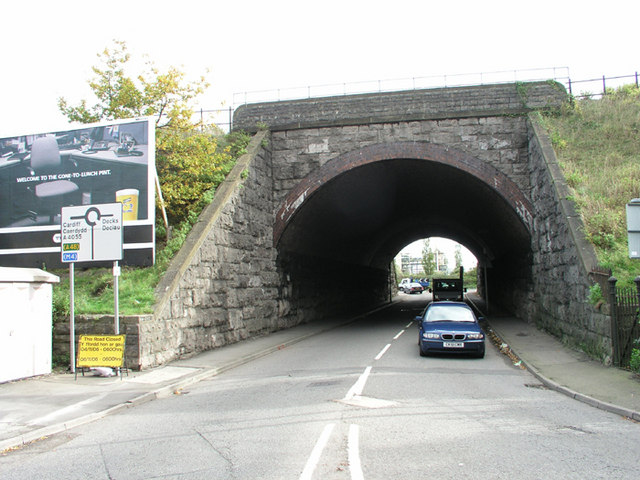
Weston Square Bridge

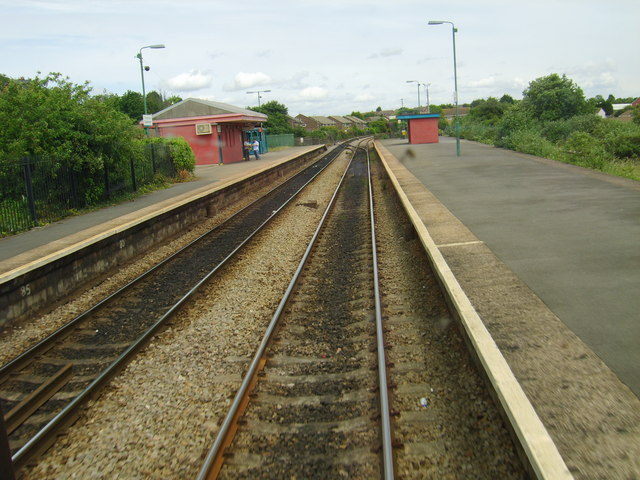
Cadoxton railway station

The name 'Cadoxton' derives from the 6th century Saint, Cadoc, and the Old English word "ton" meaning settlement; the ancient parish church of St Cadoc (called locally "the Old Village Church") still stands on Cowbridge Street — as of 2025, it is part of Barry Church in Wales; the vicarage is vacant and the Ministry Area Leader is Canon Zoë King. The Welsh language name is 'Tregatwg' (equivalent to "Catwg/Cadoc's Town"). The ruins of a chapel dedicated to Cadoc's disciple, Saint Baruc, can still be seen in Friars Road on Barry Island.

The village grew rapidly in the 19th and 20th centuries after the construction of Barry Docks in 1889. Cadoxton was integrated into Barry during this time.

== Governance ==
Cadoxton is part of the Cadoc electoral ward which elects three county councillors to the Vale of Glamorgan Council and three town councillors to Barry Town Council.
