= Palmerstown, Vale of Glamorgan =

Palmerston
- District of Barry
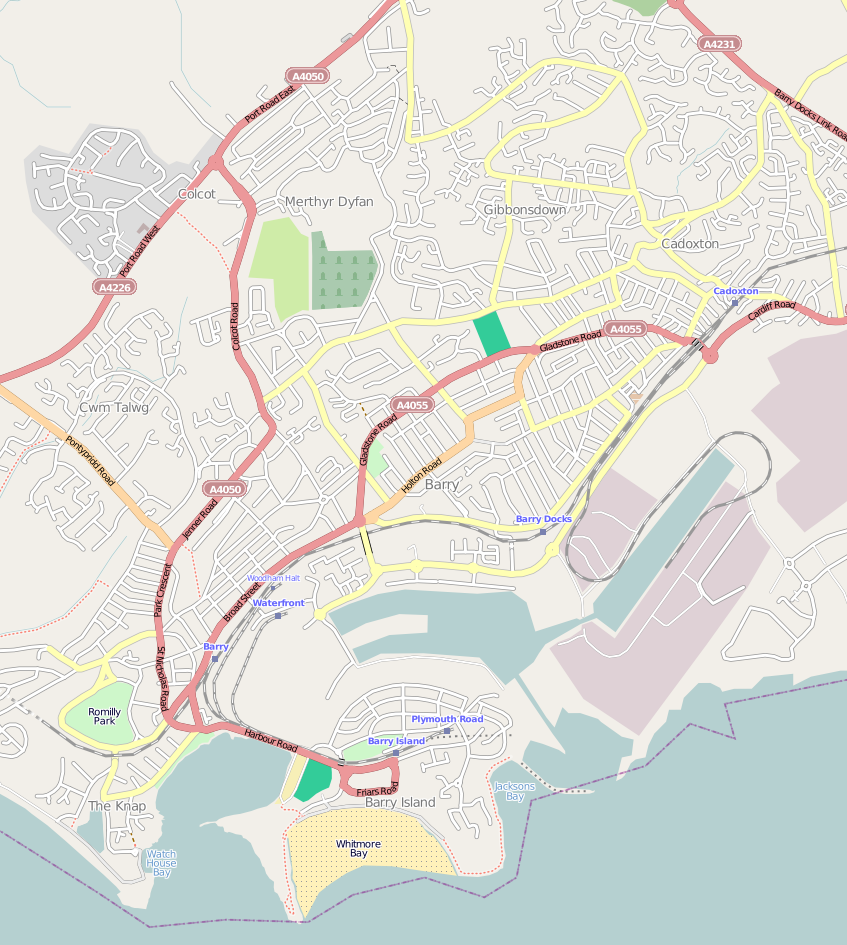
- Location in Barry
- Coordinates: 51°24′47″N 3°14′33″W
- Country: United Kingdom
- Region: Wales
- County: Vale of Glamorgan
- Town: Barry
- Time zone: UTC+0 (GMT)

Palmerstown is a south-eastern suburb of Barry in the Vale of Glamorgan south-west of Dinas Powys and 7 miles (11 km) south-west of Cardiff in Wales. It is immediately north of chemical and plastics industries such as Dow Chemicals, and Barry No.2 dock and the Atlantic Trading Estate lie south-east of No.2 dock. Its south end is separated from the A4055 Cardiff-Barry main road via Palmerston Road, (sic) a tee junction with the A4055 and access to the original part of Palmerstown's housing is via a narrow railway bridge over the Barry-Cardiff railway line and lies north-west of the former Biglis Junction which was a short distance from the so-called "Palmerston Bridge" which separates Palmerston Road from Dobbins Road.

Immediately south-east of the railway line lies a Waitrose supermarket and fuel station which took over the former Safeway business in 2004 and prior to that, the site housed J.Feltz's, Sidroy Mills's lingerie factory. Separated from the area and south east of the railway is Tŷ Verlon trading estate. Schools and other establishments within its boundary do not include the letter 'w' in the name, as is the case shown for the inset picture header on this webpage. Palmerstown includes the local Glenbrook Inn established in 1982 and to the west of the suburb was the colloquially named "Penny-ha'penny" footbridge, which being about 550 feet long, linked Palmerstown with the Coldbrook area of Cadoxton. It bridged 17 up- and 16 down-railway sidings, known in railway terms as "Cadoxton North Sidings" plus the up & down former Barry Railway Co's Cadoxton & Trehafod main line and following the complete closure of the Cadoxton-Pontypridd/Penrhos Railway line after 1963, it survived for a while after all the railway sidings were lifted. An extensive housing estate now sits on the sidings area.

Palmerstown's northern flank is skirted by the A4231 Docks Link road which severed the Cadoxton-Trehafod line at Coldbrook East (Argae Lane).

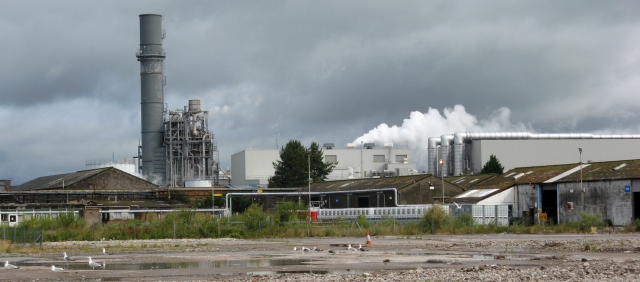
Barry Power Station close to Palmerstown

There is Barry Power Station, a gas-fired power plant built by September 1998 and accessed from the Sully Moors road about a mile south-east of Palmerstown. It lies in Sully on land previously occupied by the Supplies Reserve Depôt (SRD) and later, plastics plants. The photograph is taken from a position on Hayes Road, Sully, (i.e. from the south-east) very close to the power station and so is not in Palmerstown but like the very tall distillation columns of Dow Chemicals Plant, (formerly Dow Corning prior to 2016) off-picture to the left, its grey chimney is a prominent landmark.

Together with Cadoxton, Palmerstown is part of the Cadoc electoral ward for elections to the Vale of Glamorgan Council and Barry Town Council.
