= St Athan (electoral ward) =

- Electoral ward
- Population: 4,495 (2011 census)
- Community: St Athan
- Principal area: Vale of Glamorgan
- Country: Wales
- Sovereign state: United Kingdom
- Postcode district: CF62
- Dialling code: 01446
- UK Parliament: Vale of Glamorgan
- Senedd Cymru – Welsh Parliament: Vale of Glamorgan
- Councillors: 1 (County)

St Athan is the name of the electoral ward, coterminous with the community of St Athan, Vale of Glamorgan, Wales. It elects one county councillor to the Vale of Glamorgan Council.

According to the 2011 census the population of the ward was 4,495.

The current county councillor, Cllr John Thomas, has been the incumbent since the 1999 election when he beat the sitting Labour councillor by only 17 votes. He became leader of the Council in May 2017.

== Council elections ==
=== 2017 ===
2017 Vale of Glamorgan election
Party	Candidate	Votes	%	±%
Conservative	John Thomas	566	56.9%	−1.4%
Labour	Julie Lynch-Wilson	349	35.1%	−6.6%
Pirate	David A Elston	75	7.6%	New
Spoilt Ballots		3	0.3%	
Majority				
Turnout		993	38.43%	
Conservative hold		Swing		

=== 2012 ===
2012 Vale of Glamorgan election
Party	Candidate	Votes	%	±%
Conservative	John Thomas	435	58.3%	−15.6%
Labour	Sandra Toker	311	41.7%	+15.6%
Spoilt Ballots		8	1.1%	
Majority		124	16.4%	−31.1%
Turnout		754		
Conservative hold		Swing	-15.6%	

=== 2008 ===
2008 Vale of Glamorgan election
Party	Candidate	Votes	%	±%
Conservative	John Thomas	701	73.9%	+8.0%
Labour	Gavin Toker	248	26.1%	+3.6%
Majority		453	64.7%	+4.5%
Turnout		949		
Conservative hold		Swing	+2.2%	

=== 2004 ===
2004 Vale of Glamorgan election
Party	Candidate	Votes	%	±%
Conservative	John Thomas	598	65.9%	+14.9%
Labour	Dennis Harkus	205	22.6%	−26.4%
Plaid Cymru	Mark Roberts	105	11.6%	+11.6%
Majority		393		
Turnout		908		
Conservative hold		Swing		

=== 1999 ===
1999 Vale of Glamorgan election
Party	Candidate	Votes	%	±%
Conservative	John Thomas	442	51.0%	+10%
Labour	B. Doughty	425	49.0%	+10.1%
Majority		17		
Turnout		867		
Conservative gain from Labour		Swing		

=== 1995 ===
1995 Vale of Glamorgan election
Party	Candidate	Votes	%	±%
Labour	B. Doughty	611	60.1%	
Independent	J. James	293	28.8%	
Conservative	Ms. V. Rees	79	7.8%	
Liberal Democrats	B. Van Rooyen	34	3.3%	
Majority		318		
Turnout			44.6%	

Cllr Doughty was previously the county councillor for the ward of St Athan With Boverton on South Glamorgan County Council.
