= Court (Barry electoral ward) =

Coordinates: 51.414°N 3.263°W

- Electoral ward
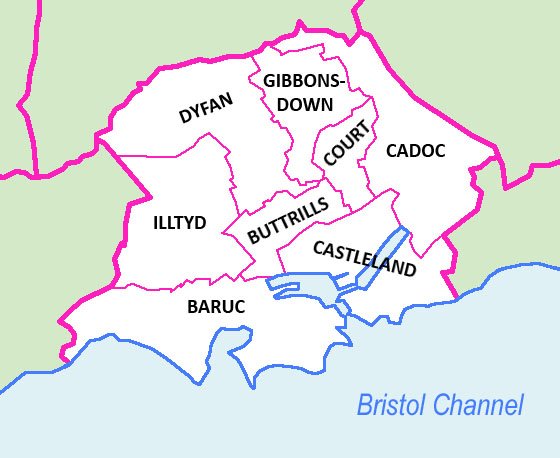
- Electoral wards of Barry, with Court at centre right
- Population: 4,748 (2011 census)
- Community: Barry
- Principal area: Vale of Glamorgan
- Country: Wales
- Sovereign state: United Kingdom
- UK Parliament: Vale of Glamorgan
- Senedd Cymru – Welsh Parliament: Vale of Glamorgan
- Councillors: 2 (County), 3 (Town)

Court is an electoral ward in Barry, Vale of Glamorgan, Wales. It is represented by councillors on Barry Town Council and the Vale of Glamorgan Council.

== Description ==
The Court ward covers the south of the Gibbonsdown area of the town, northeast of Barry town centre, but stretches south as far as Holton Road. There is a Gibbonsdown ward which borders to the northwest.

According to the 2011 census the population of the ward was 4,748.

== Town Council elections ==
The Court ward elects three councillors to Barry Town Council.

In May 2017, the ward's Labour Party councillor Bronwen Brooks became leader of Barry Town Council. Ward councillor Richard Bertin was the only Independent councillor elected to the council.

== County Council elections ==
Court is a county electoral ward, electing two county councillors to Vale of Glamorgan Council.

On 4 May 2017, the Court ward elected two Labour Party county councillors to the County Council. Former councillor Richard Bertin came third.

2017 Vale of Glamorgan Council election
Party	Candidate	Votes	%	±%
Labour	Bronwen Ellen BROOKS *	539		
Labour	Sandra Davies PERKES	463		
Independent	Richard Joel BERTIN *	419		
Independent	Andy GRIFFITHS	271		
Conservative	Robert Louis Charles FISHER	204		
Conservative	Jonathan WIGNALL	165		
Green	Stephen Ross DAVID-BARKER	90		

The Court ward was represented by two Labour councillors between the 1995 and 2012 elections, with Cllr Bertin being elected in 1999 on a Labour ticket. He resigned from the Labour Party in 2010 after a Labour Party Welsh Executive Committee Disciplinary hearing. He was re-elected as an independent councillor at the May 2012 elections.

== See also ==
- Cadoc (electoral ward)
- Castleland
