= Gibbonsdown =

- District of Barry
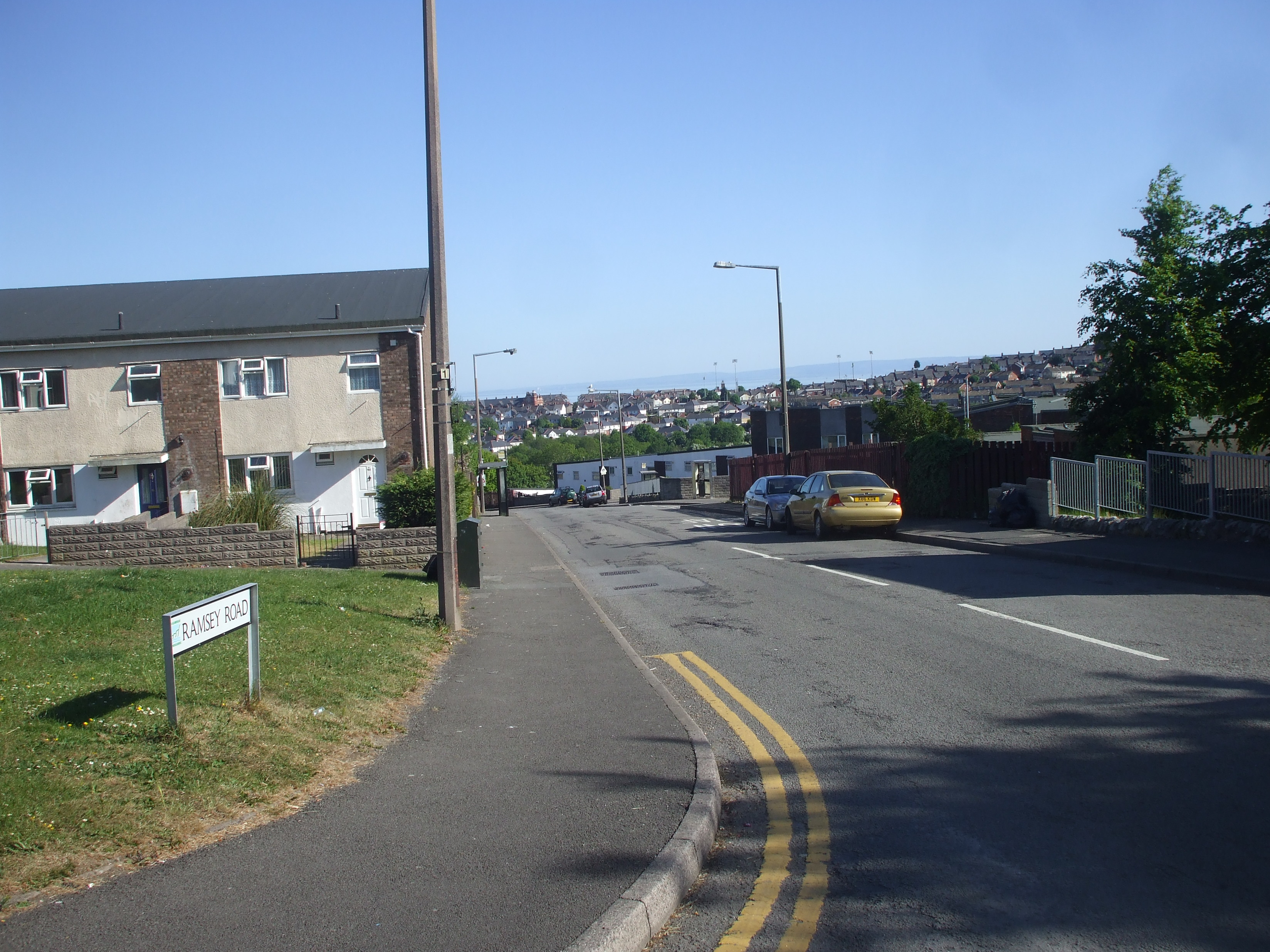
- Ramsey Road, northwestern rim of Gibbonsdown

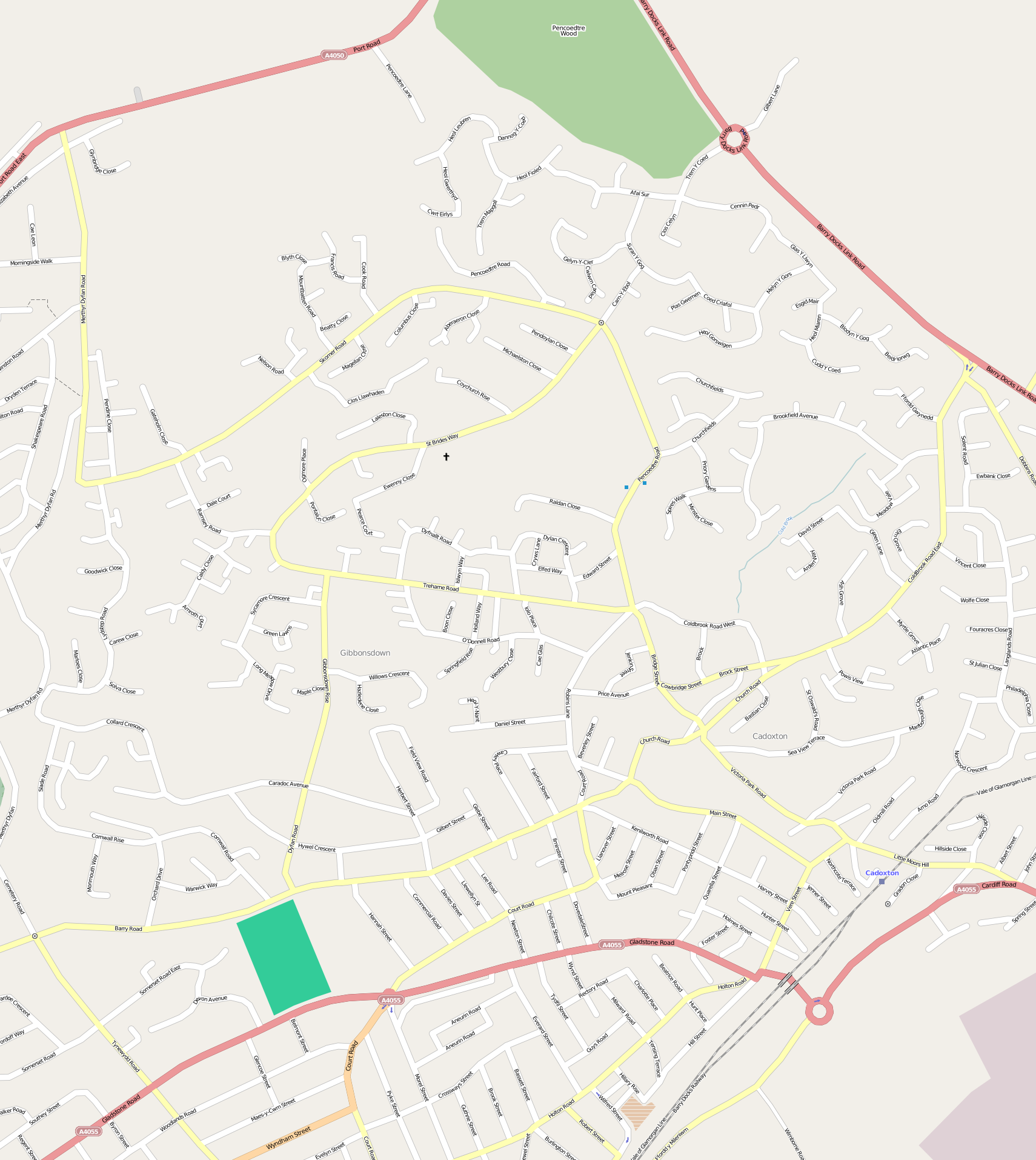
- Click above map three times to view fully.

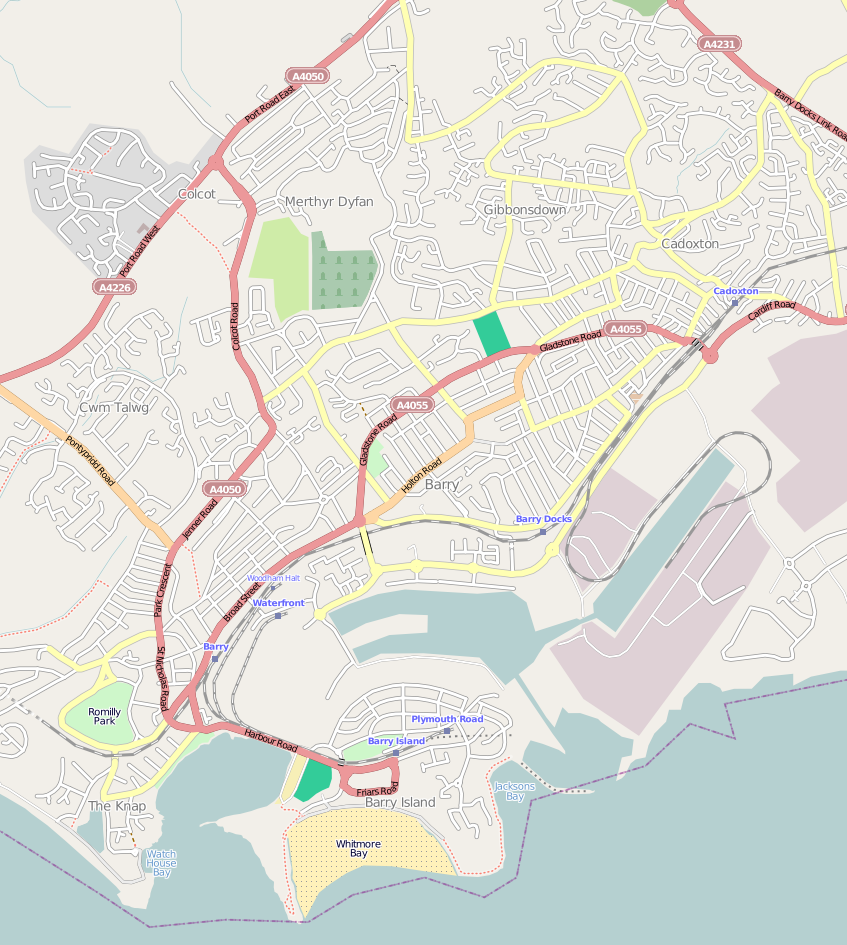
- Location in Barry
- Coordinates: 51°24′53.76″N 3°15′52.30″W
- Country: United Kingdom
- Region: Wales
- County: Vale of Glamorgan
- Town: Barry

Population (2011)
  - Total: 5,895
- Time zone: UTC+0 (GMT)

Gibbonsdown, colloquially known as 'Gibby', is a residential area and electoral ward situated in the north east of Barry in the Vale of Glamorgan, Wales. Gibbonsdown borders Merthyr Dyfan to the northwest and Cadoxton to the southeast.

== Crime ==
In 2009, Gibbonsdown was the location of the fatal stabbing of Paul Jones. John Chivers was arrested that night and later sentenced to a minimum of 18 years in prison, After the murder, Gibbonsdown Residents' Board chairwoman Molly Conway made complaints about the police for a lack of manpower and patrols on an estate well known as having problems with crime and anti-social behaviour.

== Landmarks ==
Gibbonsdown is home to the Holm View Community Leisure Centre, the Gibbonsdown Children Centre, and the Oakfield Primary School (known as the Gibbonsdown Primary School before its reconstruction). It also had Ysgol Maes Dyfan, a special school with 96 pupils as of 2005, teaching special needs children. It is also home to Pencoedtre park and the Master Mariner pub.

== Transport ==
Notable roads include Treharne Road (known to locals as "The Treharne"), Caradoc Avenue, Robins Lane, and Skomer Road, which connects the area to Wenvoe.

== Governance ==
Gibbonsdown is the name of the electoral ward covering the area. According to the 2011 UK Census the population of the ward was 5,895, of which there are 3,753 registered voters. The ward elects two county councillors to the Vale of Glamorgan Council and three town councillors to Barry Town Council. The Court ward to the south covers part of the Gibbonsdown area.

At the 2017 local government elections Gibbonsdown both county council seats were held by Welsh Labour, despite a swing to the Conservatives in the county.

A by-election had taken place on 3 November 2016 following the resignation of Labour councillor, Rob Curtis, who had been a town and county councillor. The seat was held by Welsh Labour.
