= Barry Town Council =

Community council in Vale of Glamorgan, Wales

Barry Town Council Cyngor Tref Y Barri

Type
- Type: Town council

Leadership
- Mayor: Cllr Ian Johnson (23/24)
- Seats: 22

Meeting place
- Council Chamber, Gladstone Road

Website
- www.barrytowncouncil.gov.uk

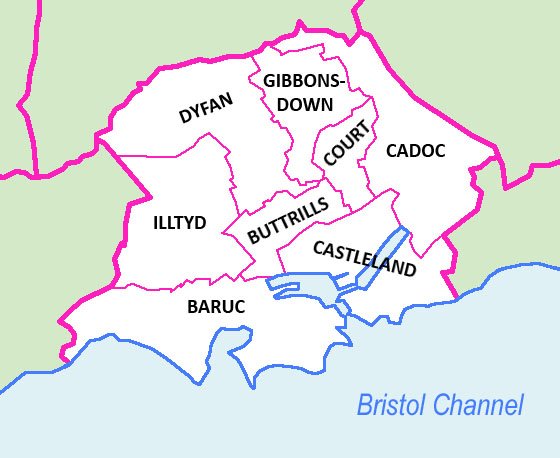
Electoral wards in the town of Barry, Vale of Glamorgan

Barry Town Council is an elected town council serving Barry in the Vale of Glamorgan, one of the largest towns in Wales.

== Functions ==
The town council describes itself as the only elected body dedicated solely to the interests of Barry residents. Its councillors provide a channel to pass on opinions to other organisations and public bodies. Councillors are members of various local governing bodies and organisations. The council's opinion is sought on a variety of local issues, for example planning applications, street names and licensing issues. The town council has direct ownership and control of Merthyr Dyfan Burial Ground and acts as agent to run Porthkerry Cemetery. It manages and staffs the Pioneer Hall and Memorial Hall. The council also provides grant aid for many local organisations.

The town council's offices are next to the Memorial Hall on Gladstone Road.

== Representation ==
Barry Town Council is the largest town council in Wales. Twenty two councillors are elected from the eight electoral wards in the town, namely: Baruc (3), Buttrills (3), Cadoc (3), Castleland (2), Court (3), Dyfan (2), Gibbonsdown (3) and Illtyd (3). These wards also elect county councillors to the Vale of Glamorgan Council

Only the mayor and deputy mayor receive any form of financial allowances. The issue was debated following the 2017 elections and the council agreed not to introduce wider remuneration to the rest of the council, which it was claimed would cost an additional £100,000.

== Mayor ==
The council elects a town mayor annually. The first mayor of Barry was Councillor Frederick Cook (1912–2008), who was also Chairman of South Glamorgan County Council and an officer of the GMB trade union. There was controversy in 2008 when the Labour controlled council chose two completely inexperienced councillors for the mayoral positions, rather than an opposition councillor with 25 years service. On 15 May 2017 Councillor Nic Hodges was elected as the first Plaid Cymru mayor of Barry. The current mayor (2023/24) is Councillor Ian Johnson.

== Council composition ==
In April 2019, a by-election was held in the wake of the resignation of the independent candidate, Richard Bertin, who represented Court ward. The successful candidate was Dennis Clarke of Plaid Cymru, thus increasing Plaid's presence on the Council from six to seven.

Following the election on 4 May 2017, Labour were the largest party, though with no overall majority. Plaid Cymru became the official opposition.

May 2017 election
Affiliation	Members
Welsh Labour	10
Plaid Cymru	6
Welsh Conservative Party	5
Independent	1

Following the election on 3 May 2012, Labour had a strong majority. In July 2016 a Gibbonsdown (Labour) councillor resigned his position after he had been charged with common assault on a 17-year-old woman. A by-election on 3 November elected Welsh Labour councillors to fill the resulting vacancies on the town council and the Vale of Glamorgan Council.

May 2012 to April 2017
Affiliation	Members
Welsh Labour	18
Plaid Cymru	3
Independent	1
