= Cowbridge (electoral ward) =

Coordinates: 51.463°N 3.450°W

- Electoral ward
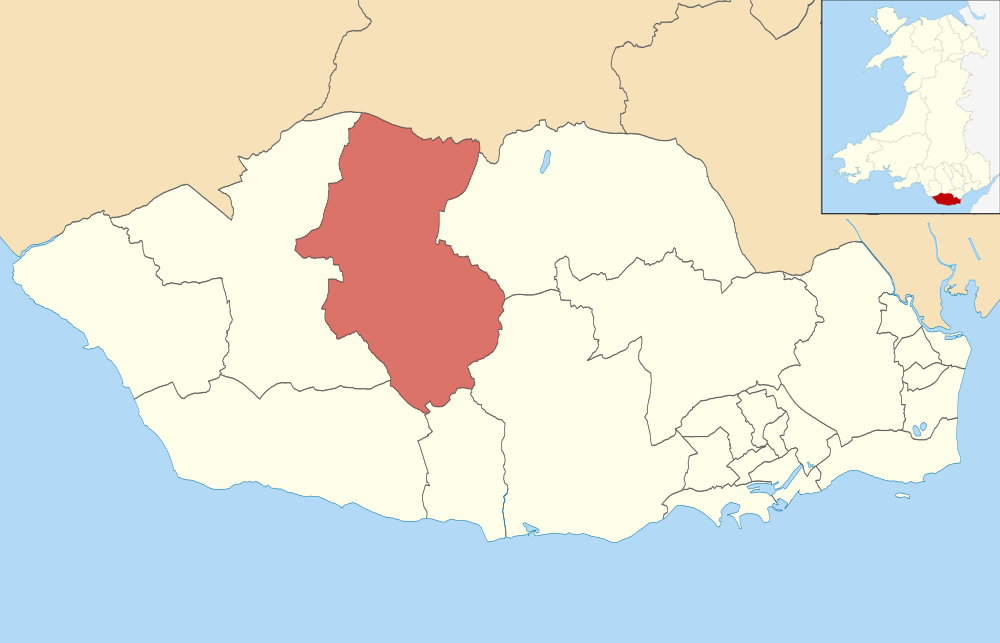
- Location of the Cowbridge ward in the Vale of Glamorgan
- Population: 6,180 (2011 census)
- Community: Cowbridge with Llanblethian, Llanfair and Penllyn
- Principal area: Vale of Glamorgan
- Country: Wales
- Sovereign state: United Kingdom
- UK Parliament: Vale of Glamorgan
- Senedd Cymru – Welsh Parliament: Vale of Glamorgan
- Councillors: 3 (County)

Cowbridge is an electoral ward in the Vale of Glamorgan, Wales, which covers its namesake town of Cowbridge as well as the neighbouring villages of Llanblethian and Aberthin and the communities of Llanfair and Penllyn. The ward elects three county councillors to the Vale of Glamorgan Council.

According to the 2011 census the population of the ward was 6,180.

Cowbridge is also the name of a community ward (covering the town itself) for elections to Cowbridge with Llanblethian Town Council.

== County elections ==
The county ward elects three councillors to the Vale of Glamorgan Council. It is currently represented by the Welsh Conservative Party.

2017 Vale of Glamorgan Council election
| Party | Candidate | Votes | % | ±% |
|---|---|---|---|---|
| Conservative | Geoffrey Addis COX | 1807 | | |
| Conservative | Thomas Hunter JARVIE | 1691 | | |
| Conservative | Andrew Carey PARKER | 1551 | | |
| Independent | Nicola Christine THOMAS | 657 | | |
| Labour | Jack HAWKINS | 544 | | |
| Plaid Cymru | Huw LLEWELLYN-MORGAN | 511 | | |
| Plaid Cymru | Nicola Jane BRANSON | 340 | | |
| Plaid Cymru | Shirley Ann HODGES | 290 | | |

Councillors Cox, Jarvie and Parker were also the winners of the May 2012 elections.

The ward has elected three Conservative county councillors since 1999, though at the 1995 county elections it elected one Conservative and two Labour Party representatives.

=== 1985–1996 ===
Between 1985 and 1996 Cowbridge was a ward to South Glamorgan County Council, electing one county councillor, a Conservative.

== Borough elections ==
The Cowbridge ward elected two councillors to the Vale of Glamorgan Borough Council in 1973, 1976 and 1979. Between 1983 and 1996 it was represented by three councillors, all Conservatives.
