= Rhoose (electoral ward) =

Coordinates: 51.410°N 3.358°W

- Electoral ward
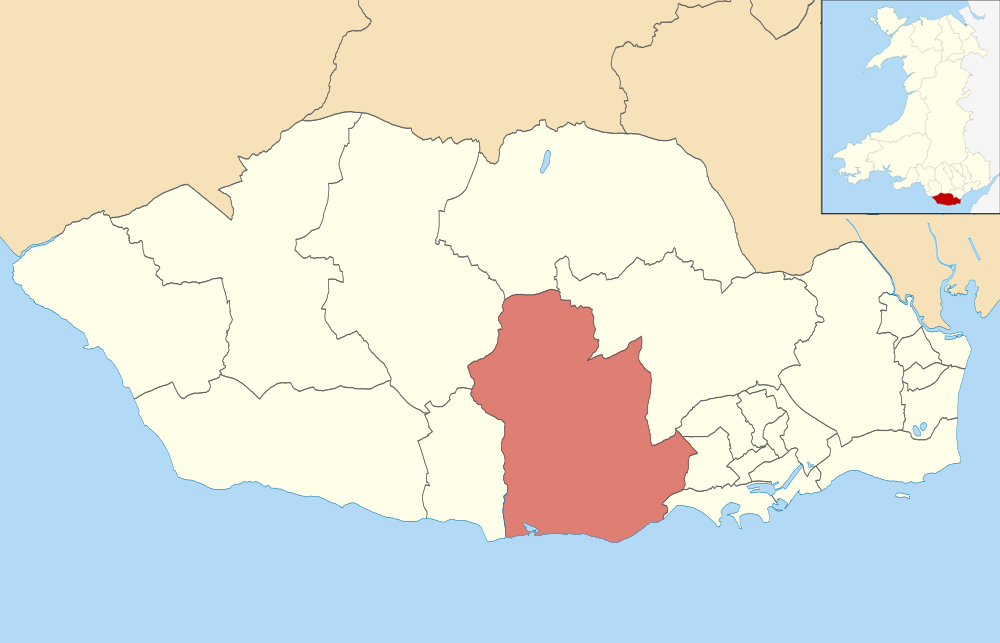
- Location of the (pre-2022) Rhoose ward in the Vale of Glamorgan
- Population: 6,907 (2011 census)
- Community: Llancarfan, Rhoose
- Principal area: Vale of Glamorgan
- Country: Wales
- Sovereign state: United Kingdom
- UK Parliament: Vale of Glamorgan
- Senedd Cymru – Welsh Parliament: Vale of Glamorgan
- Councillors: 3 (County)

Rhoose is an electoral ward in the Vale of Glamorgan, Wales, which covers its namesake village, Rhoose, as well as Penmark and the neighbouring community of Llancarfan. The ward elects three county councillors to the Vale of Glamorgan Council.

According to the 2011 census the population of the ward was 6,907.

== 2022 ward changes ==
In 2022 the community of Llancarfan was transferred to a new ward as a result of recommendations from the Local Democracy and Boundary Commission for Wales. Despite the area of the Rhoose ward halving, it gained an additional county councillor.

== County council elections ==
=== 2022 election (3 seats) ===
Rhoose
Party	Candidate	Votes	%	±%
Conservative	Gillian Bruce	915	52.2	
Independent	Samantha Campbell	895	51.1	
Conservative	William Hennessy	837	47.7	
Conservative	Kyle Bulley	833	47.5	
Labour	Mark Lloyd-Selby	697	39.8	
Plaid Cymru	Shirley Ann Hodges	505	28.8	
Abolish	Stuart James Field	430	24.5	
Green	Jane Allely	147	8.4	
Turnout				
Conservative hold				
Conservative hold				
Independent win (new seat)				

=== 2019 by-election ===
A by-election was due to take place on 14 February 2019 following the resignation of Councillor Matthew Lloyd over the council's plans to move Llancarfan Primary School to a new building in Rhoose. Candidates included the sitting Conservative Wales Assembly Member, Andrew RT Davies. Davies won the election and pledged to oppose the plans of his fellow Conservative councillors to close the local Llancarfan Primary School. He had no plans to stand down from his Assembly seat.

2019 Rhoose local by-election
Party	Candidate	Votes	%	±%
Conservative	Andrew RT Davies	1,140	61.5%	+27.7%
Labour	John Hartland	368	19.9%	+1.8%
Independent	Samantha Campbell	345	18.6%	+1.2%
Majority		772	41.6%	
Turnout		1853		
Conservative gain from Independent		Swing		

=== 2017 Vale of Glamorgan Council Election ===
Longstanding Conservative councillor Jeff James, who had first been elected as a councillor in 1979 to the Vale of Glamorgan Borough Council, decided to retire before the May 2017 election. He had also been leader of the Vale of Glamorgan Council for seven years from 1999. Both seats were taken by the Conservatives, beating the recently elected Independent councillor into third place.

2017 Rhoose Local Election
Party	Candidate	Votes	%	±%
Conservative	Matthew Lloyd	1097		
Conservative	Gordon Kemp	1067		
Independent	Adam Peter Riley	809		
Labour	Graham Matthew Loveluck-Edwards	587		
Independent	Samantha Angela Campbell	565		
Liberal Democrats	Daniel David Parrott	187		
Turnout			%	
Conservative hold		Swing		
Conservative gain from Independent		Swing		

=== 2016 By-election ===
Following the death of Cllr Philip Clarke on 31 March 2016 after a motor cycle accident, a by-election took place on 30 June 2016. It was won by Independent candidate Adam Riley.

2016 Rhoose Local By-Election
Party	Candidate	Votes	%	±%
Independent	Adam Riley	598	29.2%	
Conservative	Gordon Kemp	520	25.4%	
Labour	Graham Loveluck-Edwards	401	19.6%	
Independent	Rachel Banner	399	19.5%	
Plaid Cymru	Ian Perry	104	5.1%	
Liberal Democrats	Robin Lynn	24	1.2%	
Pirate	James Fyfe	4	0.2%	
Turnout		2050	%	
Independent hold		Swing		

=== 2012 Vale of Glamorgan Council Election ===
2012 Rhoose Local Election
Party	Candidate	Votes	%	±%
Independent	Philip Clarke	882	36.7%	
Conservative	Jeff James	810	33.7%	
Conservative	Gordon Kemp	727	%	
Labour	Damian Faulkner	713	29.6%	
Majority			%	
Turnout			%	
Conservative hold		Swing		
Independent win				

=== 2008 Vale of Glamorgan Council Election ===
2008 Rhoose Local Election
Party	Candidate	Votes	%	±%
Conservative	Jeff James	1169	41.8%	
Conservative	Gordon Kemp	1143	%	
Plaid Cymru	Philip Clarke	556	19.9%	
Liberal Democrats	Eluned Parrott	552	19.7%	
Labour	Clifford Darlington	520	18.6%	
Majority			%	
Turnout			%	
Conservative hold		Swing		

=== 2004 Vale of Glamorgan Council Election ===
2004 Rhoose Local Election
Party	Candidate	Votes	%	±%
Conservative	Haydn James	1240	63.0%	
Conservative	Gordon Kemp	1085	%	
Labour	Clifford Darlington	729	37.0%	
Majority			%	
Turnout			%	
Conservative hold		Swing		
