= Vale of Glamorgan Council =

Local government of Vale of Glamorgan, Wales

Vale of Glamorgan Council Cyngor Bro Morgannwg (Welsh)

Type
- Type: Principal council of Vale of Glamorgan

History
- Founded: 1 April 1996
- Preceded by: Vale of Glamorgan Borough Council; South Glamorgan County Council

Leadership
- Mayor: Carys Stallard, Labour since 13 May 2026
- Leader: Lis Burnett, Labour since 23 May 2022
- Chief Executive: Rob Thomas since 1 May 2015

Structure
- Seats: 54 councillors
- Graph of the party split among 54 seats.
- Political groups: Administration (29) Labour (24) Llantwit First Independent (4) Independent (1) Other parties (25) Conservative (13) Plaid Cymru (8) Restore (1) Independent (3)
- Length of term: 5 years

Elections
- Voting system: First-past-the-post
- First election: 4 May 1995
- Last election: 5 May 2022
- Next election: 6 May 2027

Meeting place
- Civic Offices, Holton Road, Barry, CF63 4RU

Website
- www.valeofglamorgan.gov.uk

Vale of Glamorgan Council (Welsh: Cyngor Bro Morgannwg) is the local authority for the county borough of the Vale of Glamorgan, one of the principal areas of Wales.

== History ==
The new Vale of Glamorgan Council unitary authority came into effect on 1 April 1996, following the dissolution of South Glamorgan. It replaced the Vale of Glamorgan Borough Council, which had been created in 1974 as a second-tier authority to South Glamorgan County Council.

== Political control ==
The council has been under no overall control since 2012. Since the 2022 election the council has been run by a coalition of Labour, the Llantwit First Independents, and one of the independent councillors.

The first election to the reconstituted council was held in 1995, initially operating as a shadow authority alongside the outgoing authorities until it came into its powers on 1 April 1996. Political control of the council since 1996 has been as follows:

Party in control	Years
Labour	1996–1999
No overall control	1999–2008
Conservative	2008–2012
No overall control	2012–present

=== Leadership ===
The role of mayor is largely ceremonial in Vale of Glamorgan, with political leadership provided by the leader of the council. The leaders since 1999 have been:

Councillor	Party	From	To
Jeff James	Conservative	May 1999	6 Dec 2006
Margaret Alexander	Labour	6 Dec 2006	May 2008
Gordon Kemp	Conservative	May 2008	May 2012
Neil Moore	Labour	May 2012	May 2017
John Thomas	Conservative	24 May 2017	May 2019
Neil Moore	Labour	20 May 2019	May 2022
Lis Burnett	Labour	23 May 2022	

=== Composition ===
Following the 2022 election and subsequent changes of allegiance up to October 2026, the composition of the council was:

Party	Seats
Labour	24
Conservative	13
Plaid Cymru	8
Llantwit First Independent	4
Restore	1
Independent	4
Total	54

One of the independent councillors forms part of the ruling coalition with Labour and local party the Llantwit First Independents. The next election is due in 2027.

== Elections ==
Since 2012, elections have taken place every five years. The last election was on 5 May 2022.

Year	Seats	Labour	Conservative	Plaid Cymru	Independent	Liberal Democrats	UKIP	Notes
1995	47	**36**	6	5	0	0	0	Labour majority control
1999	47	18	**22**	6	0	1	0	
2004	47	16	**20**	8	3	0	0	
2008	47	13	**25**	6	3	0	0	
2012	47	**22**	11	6	7	0	1	
2017	47	14	**23**	4	6	0	0	
2022	54	**25**	13	8	8	0	0	

Party with the most elected councillors in bold. Coalition agreements in notes column.

== Premises ==
The council is based at the Civic Offices on Holton Road in Barry, which were built in 1981 for the old Vale of Glamorgan Borough Council.

== Electoral divisions ==
Electoral ward boundaries in the Vale of Glamorgan from 2022

Pre-2022 electoral ward boundaries in the Vale of Glamorgan

Until 2022 the county borough was divided into 23 electoral wards returning 47 councillors. Some of these wards are coterminous with communities (parishes) of the same name. Other wards may encompass several communities and in some cases communities can encompass more than one ward. The following table lists council wards, communities and associated geographical areas prior to the 2022 boundary changes. Communities with a community council are indicated with a '*':

Ward	Communities (Parishes)	Other geographic areas
Baruc	Barry Town* (Baruc ward)	The Knap, Garden Suburb, Barry Island
Buttrills	Barry Town* (Buttrills ward)	
Cadoc	Barry Town* (Cadoc ward)	Cadoxton, Palmerstown
Castleland	Barry Town* (Castleland ward)	Bendricks
Cornerswell	Penarth Town* (Cornerswell ward)	Cogan
Court	Barry Town* (Court ward)	
Cowbridge	Cowbridge with Llanblethian Town*; Llanfair*; Penllyn*	Aberthin, City, Craig Penllyn, Llanblethian, Llandough, Llansannor, Penllyn, Pentre Meyrick, St Mary Church, St. Hillary, Trehyngyll, Ystradowen
Dinas Powys	Dinas Powys*; Michaelston*	Eastbrook, Leckwith, Michaelston le Pit, Murch, St Andrew's Major, Westra
Dyfan	Barry Town* (Dyfan ward)	Colcot, Highlight Park
Gibbonsdown	Barry Town* (Gibbonsdown ward)	Merthyr Dyfan
Illtyd	Barry Town* (Illtyd ward)	Cwm Talwg
Llandough	Llandough*	
Llandow/Ewenny	Colwinston*; Ewenny*; Llandow*; Llangan*	Colwinston, Corntown, Llysworney, Ruthin, St. Mary Hill, Sigingstone, Troes,
Llantwit Major	Llan-maes*; Llantwit Major Town*; St. Donats*	Boverton, Llanmaes, Monknash
Peterston-super-Ely	Pendoylan*; Peterston-super-Ely*; St. Georges-super-Ely*; Welsh St. Donats*	Clawdd Coch, Downs, Drope, Gwern y Steeple, Hensol, Pendoylan, St. Brides-super-Ely, St. George's
Plymouth	Penarth Town* (Plymouth ward)	Lower Penarth, Cosmeston
Rhoose	Llancarfan*; Rhoose	East Aberthaw, Fonmon, Font-y-gari, Llanbethery, Llancadle, Llancarfan, Llantrithyd, Moulton, Penmark, Porthkerry, Tredogan, Walerston,
St Athan	St Athan*	Flemingston, Gileston, West Aberthaw, East Camp, Eglwys Brewis
St Augustine's	Penarth Town* (St. Augustine ward)	Headlands, Penarth Marina
St. Bride's Major	St. Bride's Major*; Wick*	Boughton, Ogmore, Ogmore-by-Sea, Southerndown
Stanwell	Penarth Town* (Stanwell ward)	
Sully	Sully and Lavernock*	Cog, Cosmeston, Swanbridge
Wenvoe	St Nicholas and Bonvilston; Wenvoe*	Dyffryn, St. Lythans
