= Cadoc (electoral ward) =

- Electoral ward
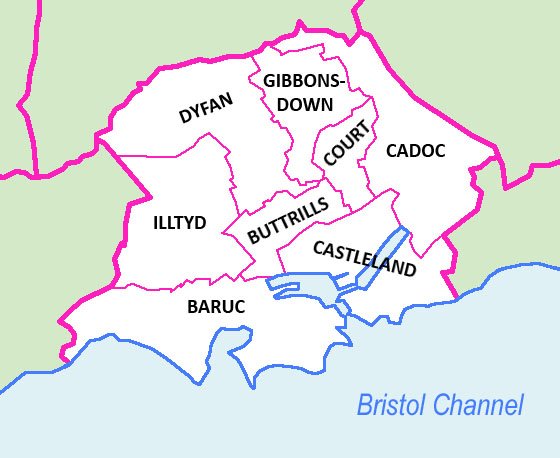
- Electoral wards of Barry with Cadoc to the northeast
- Population: 10,002 (2011 census)
- Community: Barry
- Principal area: Vale of Glamorgan
- Country: Wales
- Sovereign state: United Kingdom
- UK Parliament: Vale of Glamorgan
- Senedd Cymru – Welsh Parliament: Vale of Glamorgan
- Councillors: 4 (County), 3 (Town)

Cadoc is an electoral ward in Barry, Vale of Glamorgan, Wales. It elects four county councillors to the Vale of Glamorgan Council and three town councillors to Barry Town Council.

== Description ==
The Cadoc ward covers the northeast area of Barry including the neighbourhoods of Cadoxton (named after Saint Cadoc) and Palmerstown. Three county councillors are elected from the ward to the Vale of Glamorgan Council and three town councillors to Barry Town Council.

According to the 2011 census the population of the ward was 10,002.

== Election results ==
=== Town Council ===
Three Labour councillors were elected to Barry Town Council at the May 2017 elections. Long serving councillor (and former Labour leader and town mayor) Jane Andrews died in January 2018 leading to a by-election on 24 May 2018.

=== County Council ===
At every county election since 1995 the Cadoc ward elected three Labour Party councillors to the Vale of Glamorgan Council. In May 2017, reflecting the growth in the Conservative vote in the county, one of the seats was won by the Conservative Party.

In 2022 the number of county councillors was increased to four, as a result of recommendations from the Local Democracy and Boundary Commission for Wales.

2017 Vale of Glamorgan Council election
Party	Candidate	Votes	%	±%
Labour	Anne Moore *	966		
Labour	Neil Moore *	928		
Conservative	Rachel Nugent-Finn	912		
Conservative	Corrie Driscoll	895		
Labour	Michaela Richardson	894		
Conservative	Howard Wright	778		
Plaid Cymru	Larry Bufton	437		
Plaid Cymru	Matthew Morgan	364		
Plaid Cymru	Janet Johnson	357		
Independent	Ade Pitman	118		
Turnout				
Labour hold		Swing		
Labour hold		Swing		
Conservative gain from Labour		Swing		

At the 1985, 1989 and 1993 county elections, Cadoc elected a county councillor to South Glamorgan County Council. The Labour candidate won each of these elections.

== See also ==
- Castleland
- Court (Barry electoral ward)
