= Castleland =

Electoral ward in Vale of Glamorgan, Wales

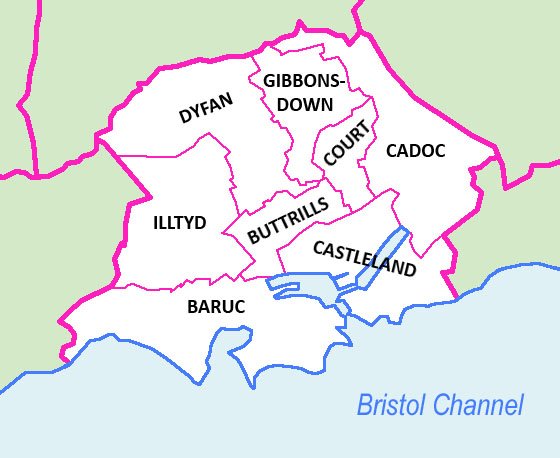
Electoral wards of Barry, with Castleland in the southeast

Castleland is an electoral ward in Barry, Vale of Glamorgan, Wales. It elects two county councillors to the Vale of Glamorgan Council.

== Description ==
The Castleland ward covered an area of Barry southeast of the town centre including a large part of Barry Docks. Two county councillors were elected from the ward to the Vale of Glamorgan Council and two town councillors to Barry Town Council.

According to the 2011 census the population of the ward was 4,852.

In 2009 the ward was designated as a renewal zone, earmarked for improvements to housing and public spaces.

== Election results ==
At the 1995 and 1999 county elections Castleland elected two Labour Party councillors. In 2004 the seats were taken by Plaid Cymru, though in May 2008 Castleland went against the trend of the rest of the county when Labour regained the two seats. Labour held both seats at the May 2012 county council elections and Plaid Cymru gained one back in May 2017.

2017 Vale of Glamorgan Council election
Party	Candidate	Votes	%	±%
Labour	Pamela Drake *	480		
Plaid Cymru	Millie Collins	453		
Plaid Cymru	Barry Shaw	450		
Labour	Helen Payne	411		
Conservative	Peter Woodford	163		
Green	Derek Cozens	139		
Conservative	Jane Burrows	135		
Pirate	Jebediah Hedges	35		
Turnout				
Labour hold		Swing		
Plaid Cymru gain from Labour		Swing		

== See also ==
- Baruc (electoral ward)
- Cadoc (electoral ward)
- Court (Barry electoral ward)
