= Baruc (electoral ward) =

Electoral ward in the Vale of Glamorgan, Wales

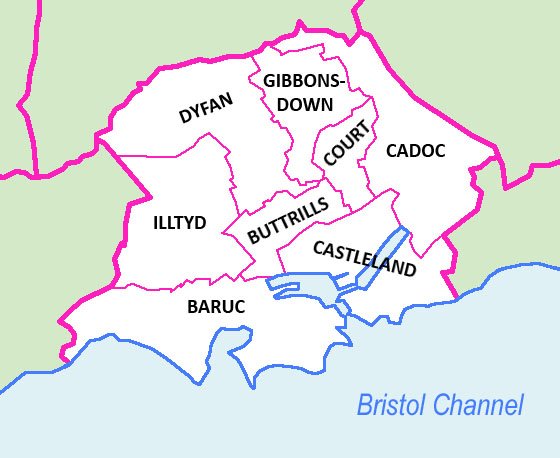
Electoral wards of Barry, with Baruc on the coast to the south

Baruc is an electoral ward in Barry, Vale of Glamorgan, Wales. It covers the southern area of the town, including Barry Island, Cold Knap and the area around Romilly Park.

The ward elects three county councillors to the Vale of Glamorgan Council and three councillors to Barry Town Council. The ward is currently represented by Plaid Cymru.

According to the 2021 United Kingdom census the population of the ward was 8,663.

In 2022, the number of county councillors was increased from two, to three, as a result of recommendations from the Local Democracy and Boundary Commission for Wales.

== Election results ==
On 4 May 2017, the Baruc ward re-elected two Plaid Cymru councillors to the County Council. On 15 May councillor Nic Hodges, also a town councillor, was elected as the first Plaid Cymru mayor of Barry, the first mayor to represent the Baruc ward for 35 years.

2017 Vale of Glamorgan Council election
Party	Candidate	Votes	%	±%
Plaid Cymru	Nic Hodges	1137		
Plaid Cymru	Steffan Wiliam	1053		
Conservative	Paul James	978		
Conservative	Victoria Roberts	929		
Labour	Brian Royson Mayne	616		

2012 Vale of Glamorgan Council election
Party	Candidate	Votes	%	±%
Plaid Cymru	Steffan Wiliam	800		
Plaid Cymru	Nicholas Hodges	776		
Conservative	Paul Baker	512		
Labour	Michael Trickey	498		
Independent	Barrie Evans	471		
Conservative	Dominic Fouracre	444		
Labour	Julie Aviet-Frassinelli	421		

=== 1973–1996 ===
At the 1985, 1989 and 1993 county elections, prior to the creation of the Vale of Glamorgan county, Baruc elected a county councillor to South Glamorgan County Council. The Conservative candidate won each of these elections.

Baruc (or Barruc) was also an electoral ward to the Vale of Glamorgan Borough Council between 1973 and 1996. Until 1983, it elected three councillors (all Conservative), from the 1983 election the ward elected two councillors (again, all Conservative).
