= Buttrills =

- District of Barry and ward
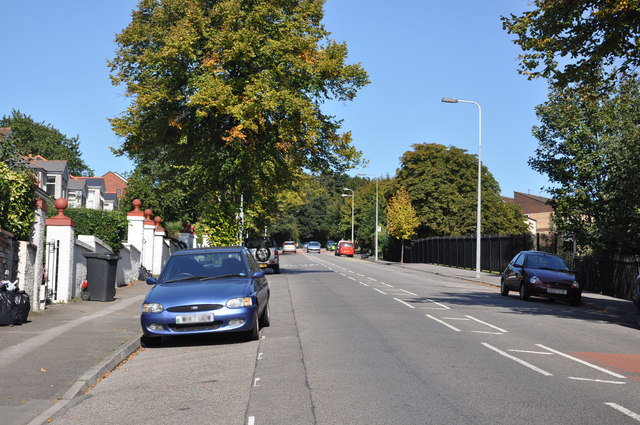
- Near the bottom of Buttrills Road, Barry

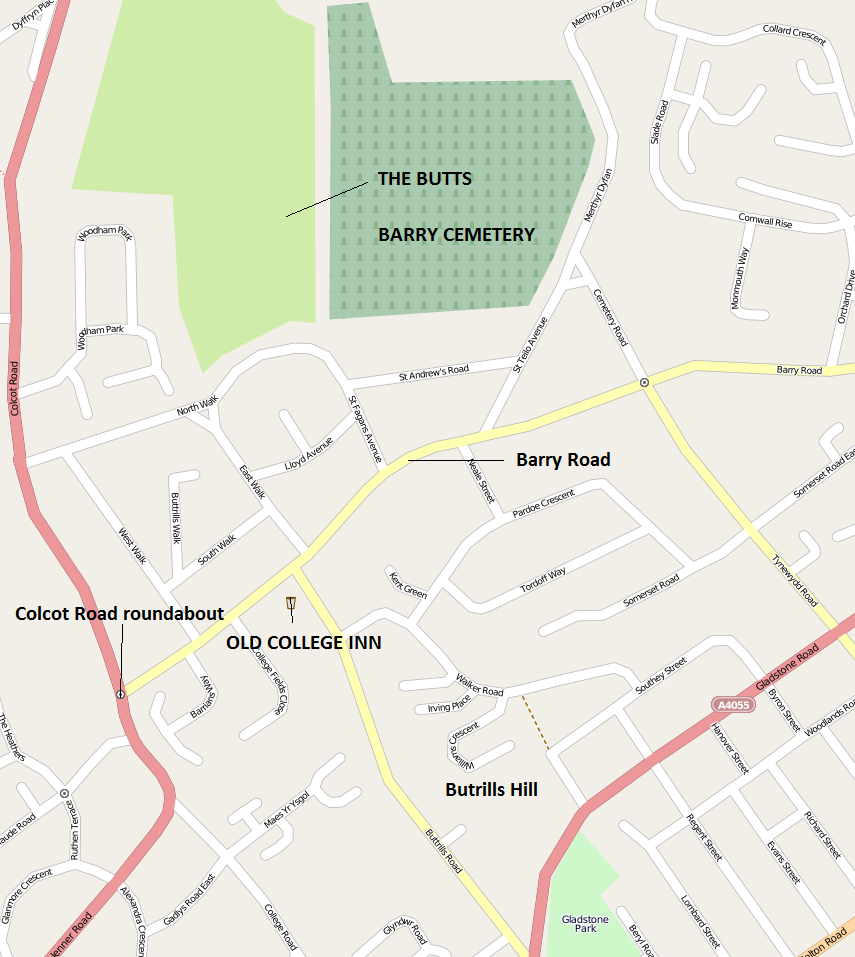
- Map of Buttrills. Click three times to view clearly.

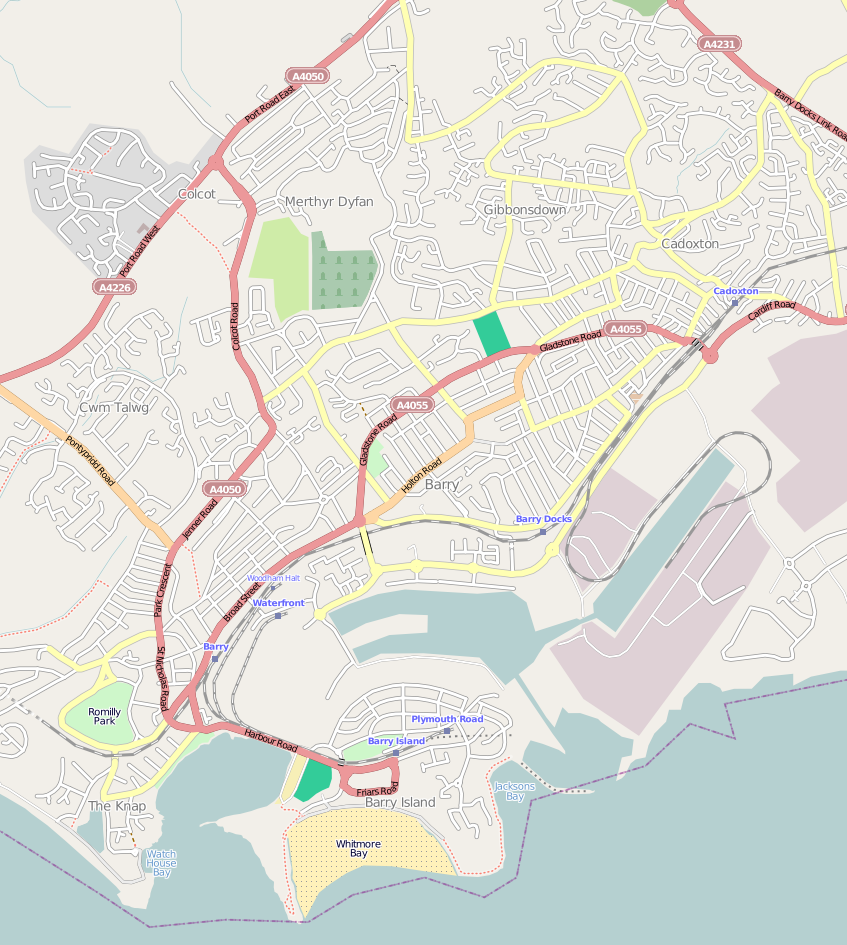
- Location in Barry
- Coordinates: 51°24′32″N 3°16′43″W
- Country: United Kingdom
- Region: Wales
- County: Vale of Glamorgan
- Town: Barry

Population (2011)
  - Total: 6,357
- Time zone: UTC+0 (GMT)

Buttrills is a northwestern-central district of Barry in the Vale of Glamorgan, in south Wales. It is also an electoral ward of the Vale of Glamorgan, the population of which taken at the 2011 census was 6,357. The centre of education in Barry in the early twentieth century, Buttrills today contains notable playing fields (known as The Butts) and Barry Cemetery.

== History ==
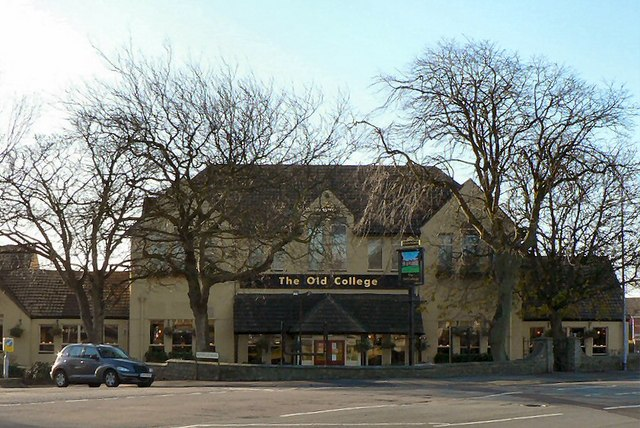
The Old College

The origin of the word Buttrills is uncertain. 'Butt' is a word for an archery shooting range, and popular legend has it that the large playing field known as 'the Butt's, adjoining Barry Cemetery, was used as a practice range by archers in the Middle Ages. Welsh longbowmen were renown for their skill, and played a key role in defeating the French at Agincourt in 1415. 'Butt' is also a Middle English word for a strip of land between roads, or a corner or 'rump' of land. 'Rill' means a brook or rivulet, or shallow channel cut into the surface or soil or rocks by running water (a small stream, the Coldbrook, rises in a valley adjoining 'the Butts' to the north).

Before the mid 19th century, Buttrills was a rural area, consisting of several farms. The area in what is now the Barry Memorial Hall and post office at the intersection with Holton Road of Barry once contained two farmhouses, one of them was named Holton Fawr Farm. Butt-Lee Court was erected on what used to be Buttrills Farm and House. Notably it was the home of the Reverend Sims, a close friend of the leader of the anti-slavery campaign, William Wilberforce. The property was sold in 1869 to John Treharne, a wealthy gentleman who also owned Friars Point House and was responsible for building a pier at Barry Island. Treharne completed the house in 1871 but later sold it to the American Consul in Cardiff, Colonel Harry Davies.

Following this, urban sprawl, fuelled by the coaling industry, engulfed the area and by the mid 20th century the area was fully urbanized. During the heavy industrial period, Buttrills Hill was considerably more congested today, with loaded lorries carrying heavy goods; problematic as it was reported to have caused accidents and damage to residential property. St. David's Methodist Church of Barry (now in Colcot) has its origins in the district of Buttrills in the 1920s when a congregation began to meet for worship in two old huts. From around 1920 for a number of years, the British military also ran Buttrills Camp in the area for the treatment and recuperation of the wounded.

The roundabout at the intersection of Barry Road and Colcot Road, which now contains a branch of the Spar was known as "Biddy's" in the 1940s and was popular with pupils at Barry County School.

== Geography ==
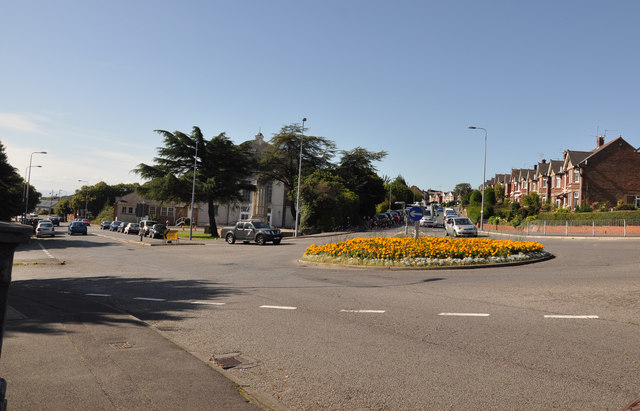
Foot of Buttrills Hill

Buttrills borders the district of Colcot to the north and includes territory to the north of Barry Road and south along Buttrills Road, although the precise boundary with the district of Gladstone is unclear. Buttrills Road is particularly steep and connects upper Barry to the western part of the CBD and the downtown district of Holton. Due to its steepness the hill staged several automobile races in the early 20th century which attracts large crowds to the hill. A small stream rises to the northwest Buttrills named Nant Talwg. This flows into western Barry and gave its name to the Nant Talwg housing estate off Pontypridd Road (formerly part of the Five Mile Lane) opposite Cwm Talwg, near Porthkerry Park.

== Facilities ==
Buttrills playing fields (known as The Butts) in the upper part of the district are extensive and today are heavily used for local weekend football matches, both youth and adult, and training. From the late nineteenth century the fields were home to Barry Rovers and Barry Rugby Club. To the east, adjacent to the playing fields, is Barry Cemetery. The major public house of note was once The Old College Inn on the corner of Barry Road and Buttrills Road at the top of the steep hill, named after what was the Old Glamorgan College below. The pub was recently closed for refurbishment, subsequently reopened as a Marston's Inn and renamed 'The Cherry Orchard'. College Fields Nursing Home is located beyond this. To the south are Gladstone Park tennis courts, a bowling centre and Barry Memorial Hall.

== Education ==
In the early twentieth century, Buttrills Hill was the centre of education in Barry. It contained three different schools and colleges at one point run by the Glamorgan Education Committee, including the Glamorgan College of Education and the Barry County School for boys. This school would later evolve into what is now Barry Comprehensive School, now located along Port Road in northern Barry, but was situated on the hill for many years. Glamorgan College of Education was divided into several wings with primary and secondary education, and aside from standard subjects offered specialist courses such as PE for women, a one-year supplementary course in teaching handicapped children, needlework lessons, and oral classes in the Welsh language. The college also contained a library.

== Governance ==
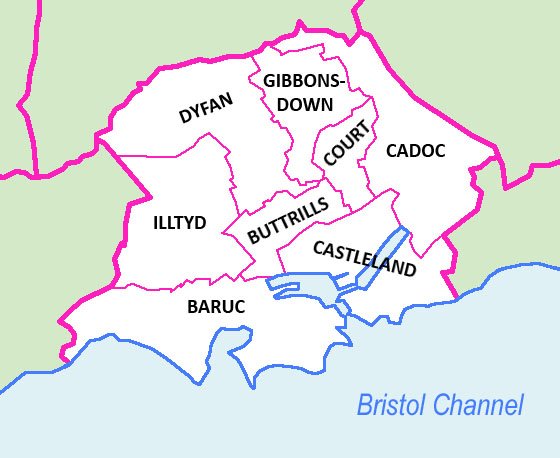
Electoral wards of Barry, with Buttrills in the centre of the town

The Buttrills electoral ward is represented by two councillors on the Vale of Glamorgan Council. The ward was previously represented by two Labour councillors, though following the death of councillor Margaret Alexander, one of the seats was taken by Plaid Cymru in a by election on 2 August 2012. Plaid Cymru held the seat at the May 2017 elections. The ward elects three councillors to Barry Town Council.
