= List of shipwrecks in June 1833 =

The list of shipwrecks in June 1833 includes ships sunk, foundered, grounded, or otherwise lost during June 1833.

== 1 June ==
List of shipwrecks: 1 June 1833
Ship	State	Description
Grand Duquesnes	France	The ship was destroyed by fire off the coast of the Netherlands East Indies. All on board survived. She was on a voyage from Manila, Spanish East Indies to Havre de Grâce, Seine-Inférieure.
Wanderer	United Kingdom	The transport ship was wrecked on the Cobbler Rocks, 18 nautical miles (33 km) off Barbados. All on board, over 300 people, were rescued.

== 2 June ==
List of shipwrecks: 2 June 1833
Ship	State	Description
Duke of York	United Kingdom	The ship was driven ashore and wrecked in a hurricane at Saint Helena.
Eamont	United Kingdom	The ship was driven ashore and wrecked in a hurricane at Saint Helena.
General Gascoyne	United Kingdom	The ship was driven ashore in a hurricane at Saint Helena, or in the Hooghly River, India. She was later taken to Bengal for repairs.
Lord Amherst	United Kingdom	The ship was driven ashore and wrecked in a hurricane at Saint Helena.
Robert	United Kingdom	The ship was driven ashore and wrecked in a hurricane at Saint Helena.
Sultan	(United Kingdom of Great Britain and Ireland) Saint Helena	The ship foundered in a hurricane at Saint Helena with the loss of all hands.

== 3 June ==
List of shipwrecks: 3 June 1833
Ship	State	Description
Argo	United Kingdom	The ship was wrecked near Livorno, Kingdom of Sardinia. Her crew were rescued.
Superb	United Kingdom	The steamship was severely damaged by fire at Belfast, County Antrim.

== 4 June ==
List of shipwrecks: 4 June 1833
Ship	State	Description
Ben Lomond	United Kingdom	The steamship was destroyed by fire and sank in the Firth of Forth off Newhaven, Edinburgh, Lothian. All 220 people on board were rescued by Lion and Stirling Castle (both United Kingdom). She was on a voyage from Stirling to Newhaven.

== 5 June ==
List of shipwrecks: 5 June 1833
Ship	State	Description
Superb	United Kingdom	The ship ran aground on the Haisborough Sands, in the North Sea off the coast of Norfolk and was abandoned by her crew. She was later refloated and taken in to Great Yarmouth, Norfolk.

== 8 June ==
List of shipwrecks: 8 June 1833
Ship	State	Description
Lively	United Kingdom	The ship departed from Belfast, County Down for Lancaster, Lancashire. No further trace, presumed foundered in the Irish Sea with the loss of all hands.
Thais	United Kingdom	The ship foundered in the North Sea off the Galloper Lightship ( Trinity House). Her crew were rescued. She was on a voyage from South Shields, County Durham to Honfleur, Calvados, France.

== 9 June ==
List of shipwrecks: 9 June 1833
Ship	State	Description
Frances and Mary	United Kingdom	The ship struck an iceberg and was holed. All seventeen people on board were rescued on 28 June by Baltic Merchant and Favourite (both United Kingdom). Frances and Mary was on a voyage from Quebec City, Lower Canada, British North America to Waterford.
Oscar	United Kingdom	The ship passed through the Skaggerak whilst on a voyage from Stettin, Prussia to Hull, Yorkshire. No further trace, presumed foundered in the North Sea with the loss of all hands.

== 10 June ==
List of shipwrecks: 10 June 1833
Ship	State	Description
Active	United Kingdom	The ship was lost in the Irish Sea off Blackpool, Lancashire with the loss of all hands.
Barbara	United Kingdom	The sloop was wrecked in the Irish Sea off Blackpool with the loss of all hands. Her hull was discovered off Rossall, Lancashire on 27 June and towed in to Lytham St. Annes, Lancashire.
Hope	United Kingdom	The brig was driven ashore and wrecked near Blackpool. Her fifteen crew were rescued. She was on a voyage from Liverpool, Lancashire to Miramichi, New Brunswick, British North America.
Norge	United Kingdom	The ship was driven ashore and wrecked at Heysham, Lancashire. Three of her crew were rescued. She was on a voyage from Liverpool to Tønsberg.

== 11 June ==
List of shipwrecks: 11 June 1833
Ship	State	Description
Albion	United Kingdom	The ship was driven ashore at "Rosscastle".
Blandford	United Kingdom	The ship was driven ashore and sunk at Porthkerry, Glamorgan. Her crew were rescued.
Chance	United Kingdom	The ship departed from Maryport, Cumberland for the Strangford Lough. No further trace, presumed foundered with the loss of all hands.
Diana	United Kingdom	The ship was driven ashore and wrecked at Formby, Lancashire. Her crew were rescued by the Formby Lifeboat. She was on a voyage from Liverpool, Lancashire to Trieste.
Edward	United Kingdom	The sloop was lost at the mouth of the River Usk near Newport, Monmouthshire with the loss of all on board.
Elizabeth	United Kingdom	The sloop was driven ashore at Blackpool. Lancashire. Her crew were rescued. She was on a voyage from Liverpool to "Friesburg". Elizabeth was assessed as "repairable".
Euphemia	United Kingdom	The ship was driven ashore at the mouth of the River Ribble, Lancashire. She was on a voyage from Liverpool to Limerick. Euphemia was later refloated and taken in to Preston, Lancashire for repairs.
Ferret	United Kingdom	The ship foundered off "Rosscastle".
Hopewell	United Kingdom	The ship was lost on the Trinity Sand, in the North Sea. Her crew were rescued. She was on a voyage from Seaham, County Durham to King's Lynn, Norfolk.
Industrie	United Kingdom	The ship was wrecked on the Horse Bank, in Liverpool Bay with the loss of a crew member. She was on a voyage from Liverpool to Emden, Kingdom of Hanover.
Jane	United Kingdom	The smack was driven ashore and wrecked at Dover, Kent.
Julie	Belgium	The ship foundered in the North Sea off Vlissingen, Zeeland, Netherlands. Her crew were rescued. She was on a voyage from Ostend, West Flanders to Havre de Grâce, Seine-Inférieure, France.
Lady Eleanor	United Kingdom	The ship was driven ashore and wrecked at Wyre Water, Lancashire.
Martha	United Kingdom	The ship was driven ashore and wrecked at Blackpool. Her crew were rescued. She was on a voyage from Liverpool to Lerwick, Shetland Islands.
Ramsay	United Kingdom	The ship was driven ashore at Blackpool. Her crew were rescued. She was on a voyage from Liverpool to Belfast, County Antrim. Ramsay had been refloated by 22 June.
Stormont	United Kingdom	The ship was driven ashore at Knott End, Lancashire. Her crew were rescued. She was on a voyage from Liverpool to Dundee, Forfarshire. Stormont was later refloated and taken in to Liverpool.
Susan	United Kingdom	The sloop sank off Southport, Lancashire with the loss of all hands.

== 12 June ==
List of shipwrecks: 12 June 1833
Ship	State	Description
Allemande	United Kingdom	The ship was driven ashore at the mouth of the River Ribble, Lancashire. She was on a voyage from Liverpool, Lancashire to Genoa, Kingdom of Sardinia. Allemande was refloated and beached at Lytham St Annes, Lancashire by 22 June.
Courier de Cette	France	The ship was wrecked at Isigny-sur-Mer, Calvados. She was on a voyage from Havre de Grâce, Seine-Inférieure to Saint-Malo, Ille-et-Vilaine.
Der Wedder	Netherlands	The ship was driven ashore on Vlieland, Friesland. She was on a voyage from Sunderland, County Durham, United Kingdom to Amsterdam, North Holland.
Diana	United Kingdom	The ship foundered in the North Sea off the coast of Yorkshire with the loss of three of her crew. She was on a voyage from South Shields, County Durham to "Hamsworth".
Drie Vriendin	Netherlands	The ship was driven ashore on Vlieland. She was on a voyage from Sunderland to "Rusterzyl".
Dunrobin Castle	United Kingdom	The sloop was wrecked at Lossiemouth, Morayshire with the loss of one of her four crew. She was on a voyage from Newcastle upon Tyne, Northumberland to Portgordon, Morayshire.
Gute Hoffnung	Duchy of Holstein	The ship was driven ashore on Vlieland. She was on a voyage from Tönning to Amsterdam.
Hero	United Kingdom	The ship foundered in the Grand Banks of Newfoundland. She was on a voyage from Liverpool to Newfoundland, British North America.
Hope	United Kingdom	The ship sank at Ramsgate, Kent. She was on a voyage from Newcastle upon Tyne, Northumberland to Plymouth, Devon.
Lark	United Kingdom	The ship was driven ashore on Vlieland. She was on a voyage from Sunderland to Amsterdam.
Neptunus	Sweden	The ship was driven ashore on Vlieland. She was on a voyage from Kristianstad to Amsterdam.
Patrick	United Kingdom	The sloop sank at Hubberston, Pembrokeshire. She was on a voyage from Newport, Monmouthshire to Cork.
Victoria Bien Aimée	France	The ship was wrecked near Calais. She was on a voyage from Dunkirk, Nord to Saint-Valery-sur-Somme.
Wellington	United Kingdom	The ship was lost in the Grand Banks of Newfoundland. Her crew were rescued. She was on a voyage from Blyth, Northumberland to Quebec City, Lower Canada, British North America.

== 13 June ==
List of shipwrecks: 13 June 1833
Ship	State	Description
Douglas	United Kingdom	The brig was abandoned in the Atlantic Ocean.
Eliza	United Kingdom	The ship sprang a leak and was abandoned in the Irish Sea off Howth, County Dublin. She was on a voyage from Ardglass, County Antrim to Dublin.

== 14 June ==
List of shipwrecks: 14 June 1833
Ship	State	Description
Hoppets Ankaer	Sweden	The ship was driven ashore on Amrum, Duchy of Schleswig. She was on a voyage from Kristianstad to Bremen.
Newbiggin	United Kingdom	The ship foundered near the Galloper Lightship ( Trinity House), in the North Sea. Her crew were rescued. She was on a voyage from Stockton-on-Tees, County Durham to Deal, Kent.
Swallow	United Kingdom	The ship was damaged by fire at Gloucester.
William	United Kingdom	The ship was wrecked near Fishguard, Pembrokeshire.
William and Thomas	United Kingdom	The ship foundered in the Irish Sea off Thumble Head, Pembrokeshire. Her crew were rescued.

== 15 June ==
List of shipwrecks: 15 June 1833
Ship	State	Description
Friendship	United Kingdom	The ship was lost off the coast of Essex. There were at least two survivors.
Good Intent	United Kingdom	The schooner was wrecked at Brielle, South Holland, Netherlands. Her crew were rescued.

== 16 June ==
List of shipwrecks: 16 June 1833
Ship	State	Description
Clyde	United Kingdom	The steamship ran aground off Portpatrick, Wigtownshire. Her passengers were rescued. Clyde was later beached at Port Nessock.
Frau Christine	Hamburg	The ship was driven ashore on Neuwerk.
Friendship	United Kingdom	The ship was wrecked on the Maplin Sand, in the North Sea off the coast of Essex. Her crew were rescued.

== 17 June ==
List of shipwrecks: 17 June 1833
Ship	State	Description
Hebe	United Kingdom	The ship was holed by her anchor and was consequently beached at Limerick.

== 19 June ==
List of shipwrecks: 19 June 1833
Ship	State	Description
Wear	United Kingdom	The ship was wrecked on the Hinder Sand, in the North Sea off the coast of the Netherlands. Her crew were rescued. She was on a voyage from Sunderland, County Durham to Dordrecht, South Holland, Netherlands.

== 20 June ==
List of shipwrecks: 20 June 1833
Ship	State	Description
Araks Аракс)	Imperial Russian Navy	The steamboat was destroyed by fire in the Volga, 23 versts (24.5 kilometres (15.2 mi)) from Astrakhan.
Ceres	(United Kingdom of Great Britain and Ireland) British North America	The ship was wrecked in the Magdalen Islands, Quebec City, Lower Canada.

== 21 June ==
List of shipwrecks: 21 June 1833
Ship	State	Description
Banshee	United Kingdom	The ship departed from Liverpool, Lancashire for Creetown, Wigtownshire. No further trace, presumed foundered in the Irish Sea with the loss of all five crew.
Salem	United Kingdom	The ship was driven ashore at Montreal, Lower Canada, British North America.

== 23 June ==
List of shipwrecks: 23 June 1833
Ship	State	Description
Eagle	United Kingdom	The ship was wrecked at Saint Vincent. She was on a voyage from Berbice to Barbados.

== 24 June ==
List of shipwrecks: 24 June 1833
Ship	State	Description
Résolue	French Navy	The Pallas-class frigate was driven ashore near Barfleur, Calvados.

== 25 June ==
List of shipwrecks: 25 June 1833
Ship	State	Description
Flora	United Kingdom	The brig was wrecked on the Blackwater Bank, in the Irish Sea. Her crew were rescued. She was on a voyage from Liverpool, Lancashire to Saint John, New Brunswick, British North America.
Phillis	United Kingdom	The ship was wrecked near Sydney, Nova Scotia, British North America. She was on a voyage from Newfoundland to Quebec City, Lower Canada.

== 26 June ==
List of shipwrecks: 26 June 1833
Ship	State	Description
Britannia	United Kingdom	The ship was run down and sunk by Ajax (United States) in the Irish Sea 15 nautical miles (28 km) north west of Bardsey Island, Caernarvonshire with the loss of all but one of her passengers and crew. She was on a voyage from Liverpool, Lancashire to Newfoundland, British North America.
Fly	United Kingdom	The ship was run down and sunk in the North Sea off Hartlepool, County Durham by Ann (United Kingdom). Her crew were rescued by Ann.
Love	United Kingdom	The ship was wrecked at Louisbourg, Nova Scotia, British North America.
Mary Ann	United Kingdom	The ship was wrecked at Dominica. She was on a voyage from London to Dominica.

== 27 June ==
List of shipwrecks: 27 June 1833
Ship	State	Description
Clara	United Kingdom	The ship was run down and sunk by a sloop in the English Channel off the Isle of Wight. Three of her crew survived.
Mary	United Kingdom	The ship was driven ashore and wrecked at Brighton, Sussex. Her crew were rescued.

== 28 June ==
List of shipwrecks: 28 June 1833
Ship	State	Description
Circassian	British East India Company	The East Indiaman was driven ashore and wrecked at the mouth of the Godavery River, India. Her crew were rescued. She was on a voyage from Ceylon to Madras, India.
Commerce de Paris	France	The whaler was wrecked in "Marmaid Island Bay", on the west coast of Africa. Her crew were rescued by the whaler Triton (United States).
Flora	United Kingdom	The ship was wrecked at Wexford. She was on a voyage from Liverpool, Lancashire to Bathurst.
Industry	United Kingdom	The ship was driven ashore at Newhaven, Sussex. Her crew were rescued.

== 29 June ==
List of shipwrecks: 29 June 1833
Ship	State	Description
Perth	United Kingdom	The ship ran aground on the Black Middings, in the North Sea off the coast of County Durham. She was subsequently destroyed by fire. Her crew were rescued. Perth was on a voyage from South Shields, County Durham to Perth.

== Unknown date ==
List of shipwrecks: Unknown date 1833
Ship	State	Description
Charles	United States	The ship was lost on Brier Island, Nova Scotia, British North America. Her crew were rescued. She was on a voyage from Boston, Massachusetts to Saint John, New Brunswick, British North America.
Dragon	(United Kingdom of Great Britain and Ireland) New South Wales	The whaler was presumed lost.
Elizabeth	United Kingdom	The ship was driven ashore in the Seine.
Emerald	United Kingdom	The ship was wrecked on the Red Island Reef. She was on a voyage from London to Quebec City, Lower Canada, British North America.
Félicité	France	The ship was destroyed by fire whilst on a voyage from Marseille, Bouches-du-Rhône to Hiers, Charente-Maritime.
Fly	United Kingdom	The ship foundered in the North Sea off the coast of Lincolnshire.
Gleaner	United Kingdom	The ship struck an iceberg in the Grand Banks of Newfoundland and foundered. Her crew were rescued by Volunteer (United Kingdom. She was on a voyage from Greenock, Renfrewshire to Newfoundland, British North America.
Henrietta	United States	The steamship struck a rock near Eastport and foundered. All on board were rescued. She was on a voyage from Eastport to Saint Andrews, New Brunswick.
Maria	United Kingdom	The brig was wrecked on the west coast of "Fowey Island". She was on a voyage from Liverpool to Colchester, Essex.
Mathilde	Netherlands	The ship was lost in the White Sea. She was on a voyage from Rotterdam, South Holland to Arkhangelsk, Russia.
Queen Charlotte	(United Kingdom of Great Britain and Ireland) New South Wales	The whaler was presumed lost.
Sophia	Hamburg	The ship foundered in the North Sea west of Sylt, Duchy of Schleswig. She was on a voyage from Hamburg to Nantes, Loire-Inférieure, France.
Stag	United Kingdom	The ship sank at Newport, Monmouthshire. She was later refloated.
Two Sisters	United Kingdom	The ship was abandoned in the Atlantic Ocean. She was on a voyage from Halifax, Nova Scotia to the Clyde.
