= Atlantic Trading Estate =

Coordinates: 51°24′3″N 3°14′41″W

Atlantic Trading Estate, Barry

The Atlantic Trading Estate is an industrial estate in Barry, Vale of Glamorgan, south Wales, UK. It is situated near the mouth of the Cadoxton River, which flows into the Bristol Channel at the Bendricks to the south‑east of Barry Docks. It is accessed via the Associated British Port‑owned Wimbourne Road from Ffordd‑y‑Mileniwm near Weston Square, Cadoxton, or from the public Hayes Road from the main B4267 Sully Moors Road, south‑west of the village of Sully. It is sometimes considered to be in Sully. It covers an area of 9.22 acres (3.73 ha).

Archaeological excavation at the estate has determined that it was used as a "prehistoric settlement and early Christian burial site". There was evidence of a Bronze Age settlement, as well as small, unenclosed inhumation cemeteries dating from the late‑Roman through post‑Roman periods.

== History ==
The estate was a Supply Reserve Depot before becoming a trading estate. In 1971, the Official Report of the Standing Committees delivered to Parliament referred to "a new project called the Atlantic Trading Estate, on the seaboard near Barry", stating that "there are a considerable number of new undertakings, and it is creating a significant, though relatively small, amount of employment". In November 2001, APC Panels sought permission to build a new factory and office development at the Atlantic Trading Estate.

The estate, located in a deprived area of the town, has long been the target of arson and vandalism. In April 2006, a fire broke out in the Arcade Buildings, a block of industrial units on the Atlantic Trading Estate. In February 2007, a car was set on fire, and in September, a lorry trailer containing rubbish and tyres was set ablaze in a suspected arson attack. In mid‑April 2008, a major fire broke out on the estate, affecting a derelict industrial unit, a warehouse, and several garages. Several months later, two men were arrested on the estate, suspected of dismantling metal girders and of arson.

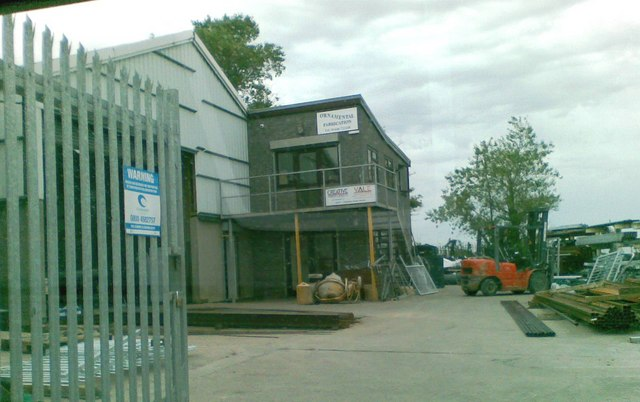
Atlantic Trading Estate in 2011

In January 2007, it was announced that a household waste recycling centre was planned for the Atlantic Trading Estate to handle "the recycling of glass, aluminium, plastic, battery boxes, fluorescent tubes, gas, oil, white goods, and other waste". Oil recycling tank facilities were added to the centre in 2011. In 2014, it was reported that MDA Renewables Ltd planned to build a 25‑metre‑high 100 kW turbine on the southern boundary of the estate, stating: "The proposed development will create a sustainable and renewable form of energy which will assist in meeting the Welsh Government's objectives in terms of reducing carbon emissions and minimising the causes of climate change."

== Archaeological site ==
The site has been excavated and radiocarbon dated. Middle Bronze Age wares were uncovered, as well as "beaker, food vessel, and collared urn" remnants within a round‑house built of planks. An Iron Age "rim and a basal angle of a vessel" was also among the findings unearthed at the site.

More than 40 burials in wind‑blown sand were situated within a small, unenclosed Roman cemetery; this is considered rare for the Late Roman period in south‑eastern Wales. Genetic links were identified between skeletons, giving "the impression of an extended family group". During the construction of the former Supply Reserve Depot, workmen discovered human remains, some of which were found in lead coffins with scallop‑shell decoration; no official record of the discovery was made, as much of the lead was sold as scrap metal.
