= Porthkerry Viaduct =

Railway bridge near Barry, Wales

Coordinates: 51.3935°N 3.3178°W

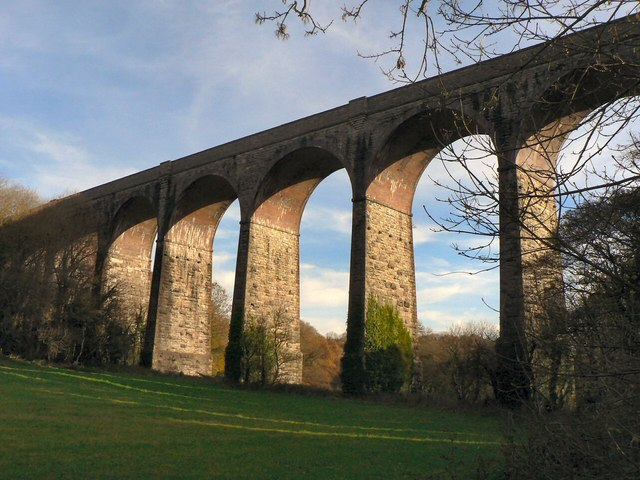

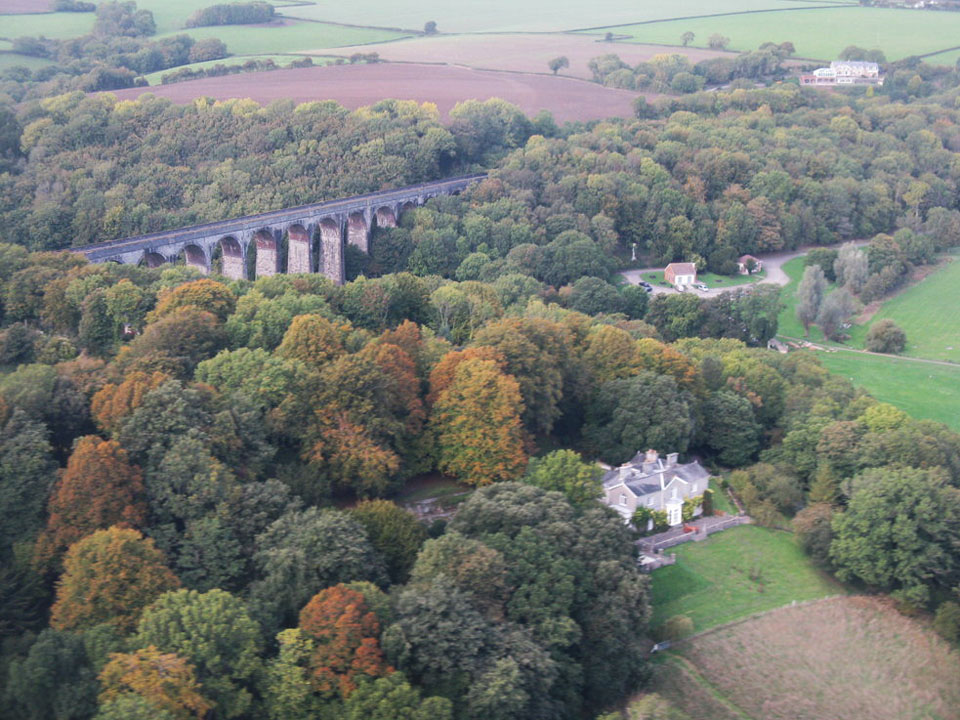
Aerial view of Viaduct Wood and Porthkerry Viaduct

Porthkerry Viaduct is a railway viaduct near Barry in the Vale of Glamorgan, Wales.

The viaduct was designed and engineered by James Szlumper and William Szlumper, and was contracted to the Pethick Brothers to be built in the late nineteenth century in order to carry the Vale of Glamorgan Railway between Tondu via Coity Junction Bridgend and Barry Docks. Construction started in 1894, but on 18 August 1896 it was observed that No. 9 pier showed signs of settlement and on 20 August, No. 10 also settled. Over the course of three days, No. 9 pier had sunk 4 ft 6 in (1.37 m) and No. 10 had sunk 3 ft 6 in (1.07 m) into the ground, delaying construction as three arches became so distorted that they had to be taken down. Subsequently, Nos. 10 & 12 piers had to be underpinned and No. 11 pier reconstructed. The viaduct was opened on 1 December 1897, but by 16 December it was observed that the embankment at the Barry end was slipping away and had moved pier No. 15 slightly and so Nos. 13, 14 & 15 footings were repacked with stone to stabilise the embankment. However, on 10 January 1898, an indentation in the track above pier No. 13 was observed and traffic was immediately stopped following which, the pier was gradually pushed forward by the embankment and had sunk 13 inches (33 cm). A 2 1/2-mile (4 km) loop line diversion was quickly built around the north-west of the valley, whilst repairs and underpinning were entrusted to Price and Wills, builders of the No. 2 dock in Barry. The viaduct eventually reopened on 8 January 1900.

The viaduct has sixteen arches, thirteen at 50 feet (15 m) and at the Barry end, three at 45 feet (14 m) span and rising to a height of 110 feet (34 m) and nowadays spans the northwest end of Porthkerry Park. It became Grade II listed in 1963.

Originally designed as a route to bring coal to Barry Docks, the railway now carries a passenger service and some freight traffic between Cardiff and Bridgend when engineering occupations are necessary on the South Wales main line via St Fagans. Heavy coal traffic to the merry-go-round coal discharge system at Aberthaw Power Station ceased by August 2019 and the "B" power station was officially closed in December 2019. Passenger trains run between Cardiff, Cardiff Airport and Bridgend via Llantwit Major.

The Porthkerry Viaduct was designed to be an exact copy of the Shillamill Viaduct spanning the river Lumburn at Gullworthy, north of Tavistock but in fact now barren of track on a dismantled railway and also a listed structure, the Shillamill viaduct is laid on a gentle curve and has only 12 arches.

Watercolour artist Thomas Frederick Worrall lived in Barry from 1913, and painted Porthkerry Viaduct.
