= Barry Docks =

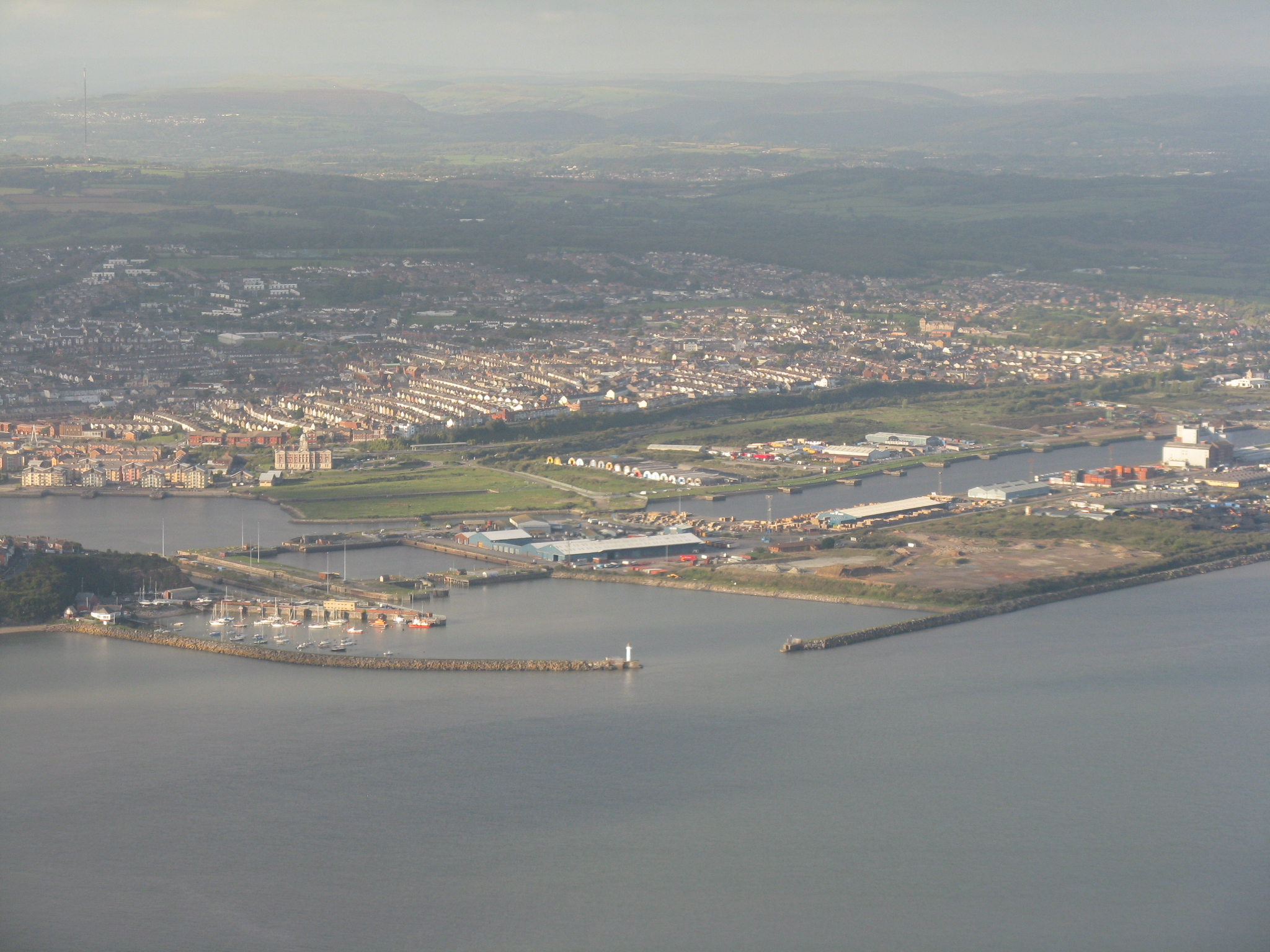
- View from the south (2010)
- Interactive map of Barry Docks
- Location within Wales

Location
- Country: Wales
- Location: Barry, Vale of Glamorgan
- Coordinates: 51.398242°N 3.268954°W

Details
- Opened: 1889
- Owned by: Associated British Ports (ABP)
- Size: 531 acres (215 ha)

Barry Docks (Welsh: Dociau'r Barri) is a port facility in the town of Barry, Vale of Glamorgan, Wales, a few miles southwest of Cardiff on the north shore of the Bristol Channel. The docks were opened in 1889 by David Davies and John Cory as an alternative to the congested and expensive Cardiff Docks to ship coal carried by rail from the South Wales Coalfield. The principal engineer was John Wolfe Barry, assisted by Thomas Forster Brown and Henry Marc Brunel, son of the engineer Isambard Kingdom Brunel.

The docks occupy the former sound between Barry Island and the mainland. The contractors built dams to connect each end of the island to the mainland, drained or pumped the water from the site and excavated it. They used the material to level the area around the docks and for the core of breakwaters to protect the entrance. The works included a basin with gates at each end, which served as a lock between the sea entrance and the docks, the dock walls and quays, coal loading equipment and railways to deliver coal from the mines to the docks. A second dock and second entrance lock were added in 1898. The Barry Dock Offices were built in 1897–1900 by Arthur E. Bell, architect, of Cardiff and Barry, whose father, James Bell, was resident engineer of The Barry Railway Co.

In 1909, about 8,000 women and 10,000 men were employed in the docks. By 1913, the docks were the busiest coal port in the world, exporting 11.05 million long tons (11,230,000 t; 12,380,000 short tons) at their peak. Coal exports declined after World War I (1914–1918). Strikes and the Great Depression of the 1930s caused further problems. The docks proved useful during World War II (1939–1945); they were nationalised soon after the war ended. The Geest company used the docks to import West Indian bananas from 1959 until the 1980s. From 1957, many obsolete railway wagons were scrapped and cut up at the former West Pond site between Barry and Barry Island. From 1959, many steam locomotives were withdrawn from service and stored on sidings beside West Pond sidings area and more than 200 of them were recovered by enthusiasts for conservation or restoration.

Parts of the docks have since become industrial estates such as the Atlantic Trading Estate. The area around the first dock, now called The Waterfront, has been redeveloped for residential and commercial use. The second dock is still active and generally handles chemicals and timber.

== Location ==
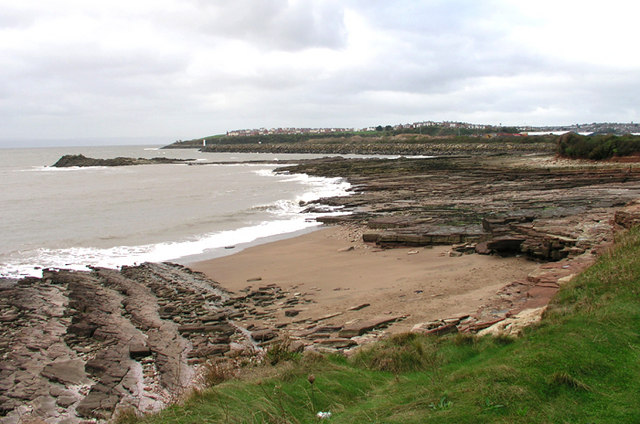
The Bendricks looking west. The lighthouse at the entrance to the channel leading to the docks is just visible with Barry island on the skyline.

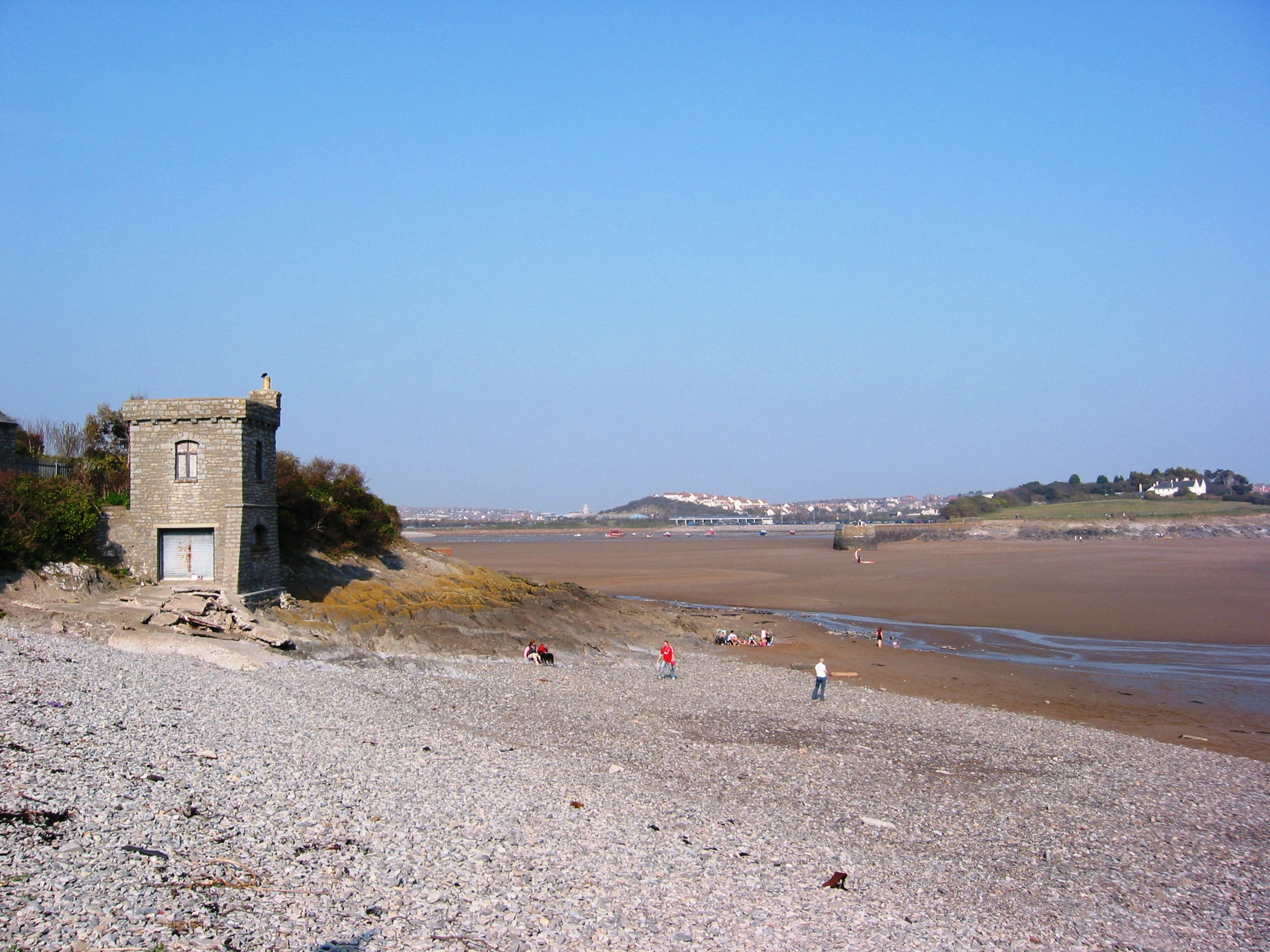
The Old Harbour, Barry, looking north towards the causeway that was built to Barry Island

Barry is situated on the north shore of the Bristol Channel, a few miles southwest of Cardiff.

Before the docks were created, Barry Sound lay between Barry Island and the mainland, sheltered from storms by the island and by Friar's Point. It had been a port since medieval times. The island was about 1 mile (2 km) long and 1/2 mile (800 m) wide, with a height of 120 feet (37 m) above mean sea level. The mainland slopes up to the north, so the sound was well sheltered from the wind. No rivers or streams ran into the sound. (Note: Early maps conflict and show that the River Cadoxton, originating from feeder brooks meeting at Michaelston-le-pit between Ely, Leckwith, and Wenvoe to the northeast, passed through Dinas Powys and Sully Moors and bypassed the Barry shoreline to meet the sea near Cold Knap Point before Cold Knap promenade and Watchtower Bay was developed decades later. With the coming of the docks, the River Cadoxton was re-routed from Sully moors through what was later to become the Supplies Reserve Depot (SRD) and later still the chemical complexes in the area, to discharge southeast of the dock's southeast breakwater at the Bendricks. For many years after the last war, with the dissolution of the SRD and coming of the chemical works, effluent discharge from some of them was carried along the river to the sea. This turned the water white in colour and caused it to give off a pungent effervescent odour until bylaws brought this pollution to an end. In turn, the hitherto white shoreline at that area gradually returned to its normal sandstone colour.)

The Bristol Channel is known for its tidal range. During normal spring tides there is a range in water level of 36 feet (11 m), and during normal neap tides a range of 19.5 feet (5.9 m), but tides can peak at around 43 feet (13 m). When this happens, seawater flows into Barry Docks over the top surface of the hollow sections of the lock gates, and flows back over them as the tide falls. At low water during spring tides, there is a depth of 25 feet (7.6 m) at a distance of 2,100 feet (640 m) from the site of the dock entrance.

== Background ==
For most of the 19th century Cardiff was the main port for exporting South Wales coal. Cardiff shipped 998,000 long tons (1,014,000 t; 1,118,000 short tons) of coal in 1859, 1.9 million long tons (1,900,000 t; 2,100,000 short tons) in 1867 and 7.7 million long tons (7,800,000 t; 8,600,000 short tons) of coal in 1889. John Crichton-Stuart, 2nd Marquess of Bute (1793–1848) had built the Cardiff Docks, which remained in the possession of his son. Other coal mine owners had no choice but to use these docks and the Taff Vale Railway to export their product under terms dictated by Bute. They complained about delays and congestion at the port, and said that Bute was charging extortionate fees.

A scheme to build a dock at Barry dated back as early as 1865, when John Thomas, a retired farmer of Barry Island, proposed a Glamorgan Coast Railroad to link Pencoed, Llansannor, Cowbridge and Aberthaw with Barry, and a further line to Cogan, where Penarth Dock and the Grangetown line to Cardiff were already under construction. Thomas proposed building a dock accessed by the railway for export of coal, iron and limestone, and import of hay, grain and vegetables for the mining districts. The idea was also attractive to railway developers of the period. The Ogmore Valley Railway Company wanted to increase revenue by carrying coal for shipment to the docks at Cardiff and Penarth. H. Voss, the engineer of the Ely Valley Railway Company and the Great Western Railway, also saw its commercial potential, and made a proposal to Jenner of Wenvoe Castle to build a dock at Barry, the largest in the district, which would be connected by rail to Peterston-super-Ely on the main South Wales line.

Barry Harbour Act 1866
- Act of Parliament
- Parliament of the United Kingdom
- Long title: An Act for converting the Estuary of Barry Island in the County of Glamorgan into a Tidal Harbour, and for constructing Works in connexion herewith; and for other Purposes.
- Citation: 29 & 30 Vict. c. liii

Dates
- Royal assent: 11 June 1866

The docks in Barry today

Jenner was granted permission to extend the railway through a series of acts in 1866, including the Barry Railway (Alteration) Act 1866 (29 & 30 Vict. c. xcii) and the Barry Railway (Extension) Act 1866 (29 & 30 Vict. c. cccxxxiii) which authorised the building of a narrow-gauge (4 ft-8½in) line from Barry to Cogan, joining the line to Cardiff. The Barry Harbour Act 1866 (29 & 30 Vict. c. liii) authorised another company to build a 600-yard (550 m) quay extending from where Buttrills Brook entered the old dock near the northwest end of the present No. 1 dock. The act permitted the deepening of Cadoxton River, which entered the sea at Cold Knap, to allow for large ships to reach the quay, and the Barry Railway Company and the Barry Harbour Company were established. However, the plan was never realised. Jenner made another attempt in 1868. It failed because he did not attract support from the coal traders, who preferred to operate in Cardiff.

Jenner dropped the idea after the Bute Docks Act 1874 (37 & 38 Vict. c. cxviii) allowed an additional dock at Cardiff, but the movement to build a dock at Barry continued to gain momentum, this time by the Plymouth Estate trustees, major landowners in Glamorgan who advocated the building of the railway from Barry to Cogan. They proposed the Penarth, Sully and Cadoxton Railway Bill, which was approved by Parliament as the Penarth Extension Railway Act in 1876. They extended the line privately, opening it on 20 February 1878.

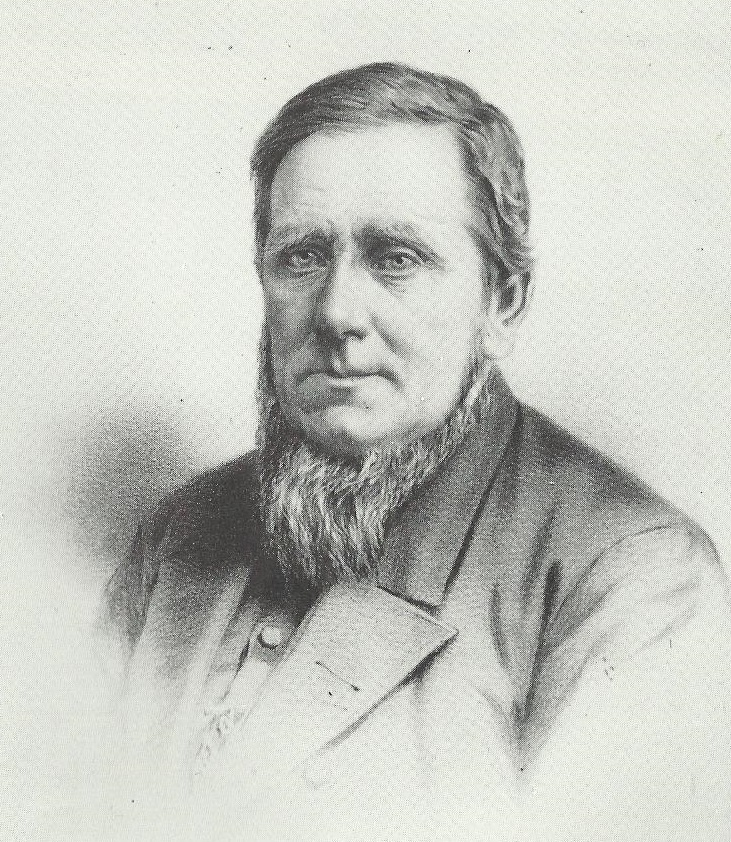
David Davies

== Construction ==
=== Project launch ===
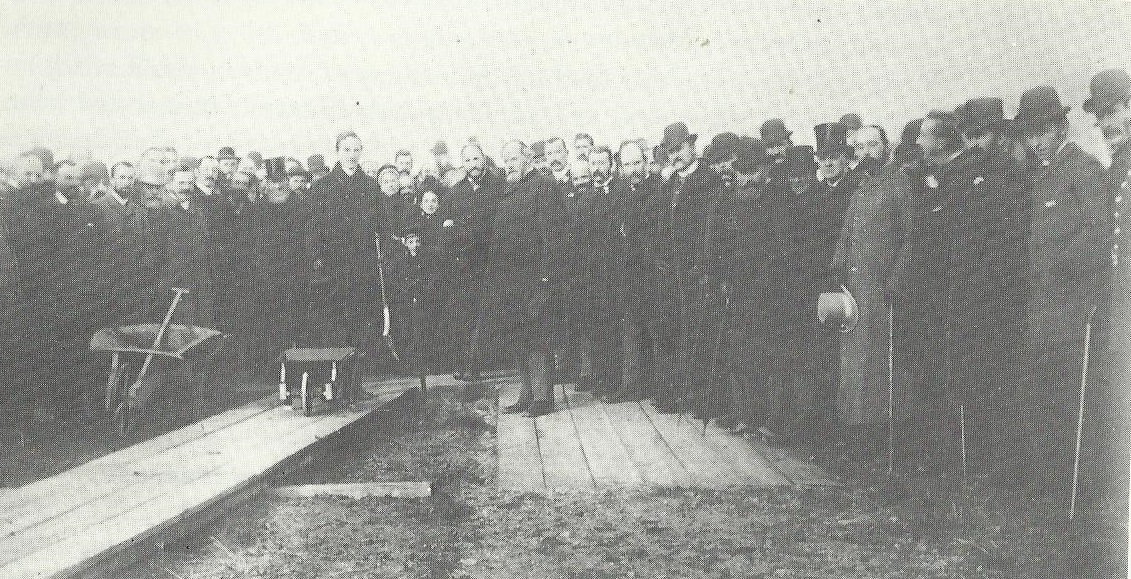
Lord Windsor (later Earl of Plymouth) holds out spade to cut the first sod of Barry Dock on Castleland Point in 1884.

In 1883 a group of mine owners applied for parliamentary permission to build a dock at Barry and a new railway to serve it. Barry Sound was a natural choice for the dock site since comparatively little excavation was needed. David Davies and John Cory were spokesmen for the group. Davies, son of a small farmer in Montgomeryshire, was the founder of the Ocean Coal Company. He was the leader of the Rhondda mine owners, and was already experienced in railway construction. Cory was establishing a network of coal bunkering depots around the world. At first rejected, the group won permission for the port and railway in August 1884, when the Barry Dock and Railways Act 1884 (47 & 48 Vict. c. cclvii) was passed. On 14 November 1884 a group of ship and mine owners "trudged out to Castleland Point—near the later Dock Offices—to dig a small hole in the ground with the aid of a ceremonial spade, a wheelbarrow and a plentiful supply of planking to keep the autumn mud off their shoes."

The lead engineer was John Wolfe Barry, assisted by Thomas Forster Brown and Henry Marc Brunel, son of the famous engineer Isambard Kingdom Brunel. John Robinson was the resident engineer and the works were built by T. A. Walker. Barry was the son of the architect Charles Barry, and was the engineer of Tower Bridge, Surrey Commercial Docks, Natal Harbour and many other major works. Houses were built for the construction workers that would be used by the dockworkers after the docks had been opened. Labourers and shopkeepers began to flood into the area.

=== Dams and excavation ===
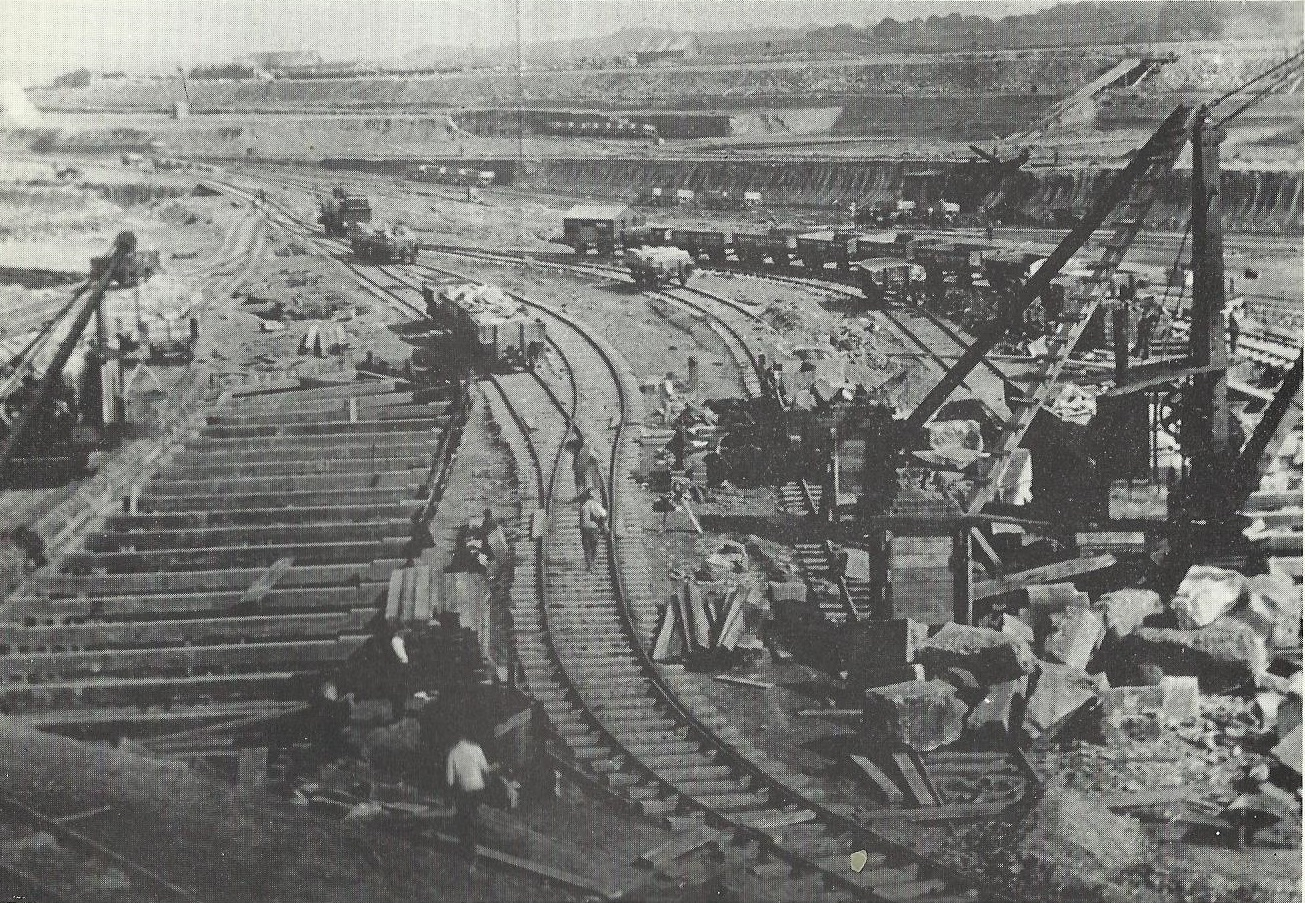
No.1 Dock under construction

Before construction could start, the site of the dock and quays, covering 200 acres (81 ha), had to be clear of water. Three dams were built from the island to the mainland. The centre dam divided the dock area in half, another was further west and a third dam extended east across what would be the entrance. The two outer dams completely closed off the site from the sea. The centre dam was built without much difficulty by simply tipping material to form an embankment, although some of the earth sank into the mud, so more had to be added.

The western dam caused much more trouble, since it rested on mud that varied in depth to upwards of 40 feet (12 m). The ends of the dam were formed by tipping earth from wagons run out from the mainland and the island. In the centre, the earth sank into the deep mud and slid away with it. A viaduct of timber piles was built across the gap, to carry loaded trucks from which the earth was thrown out. As the ends approached each other, the tide current was too fast. The contractor twice tried to close the gap with earth at low-water neap tide, but each time the water broke through to make a gap 80 feet (24 m) wide, through which the tide poured at 5 miles per hour (8.0 km/h).

The problem was solved in July 1885 by dropping shutters between horizontal timbers attached to the viaduct piles when the tide had receded, then backing up the shutters with as much stone and earth as could be delivered from preloaded trucks. This worked. A cast-iron pipe 40 inches (1,000 mm) in diameter had been laid through the dam to form a sluice, with a flap on the outside that was closed at high tide and opened as the tide receded. By this means the west part of the works were drained to the level of the pipe, and the remaining water was pumped out at an average rate of 150,000 US gallons (570,000 L; 120,000 imp gal) per hour by a Cornish beam engine brought down from the Severn Tunnel works. The causeway along the dam permanently linked Barry Island to the mainland.

The eastern dam was made of piers of masonry with marl foundations, backed up with earth, leaving four 15 feet (4.6 m) openings through which the tide flowed. It included a temporary stone dam where the entrance to the docks would be built. In March 1886 the openings in the eastern dam were quickly closed with planks, backed with concrete. Later the planks were removed and the concrete faced with brickwork in cement mortar. Three 12-inch (300 mm) pipes with valves ran through the lowest part of the concrete wall, allowing the water to drain to this level while excavation proceeded. The remaining water was pumped out.

Gunpowder was used to loosen the marl, which was then removed by steam shovels. Various other steam-powered devices were used to remove mud, clay, and rock. All the hard material was used for embankments and quay roads around the docks. The mud was placed behind these, and in trenches to seal the works from water, using special side-tipping wagons.

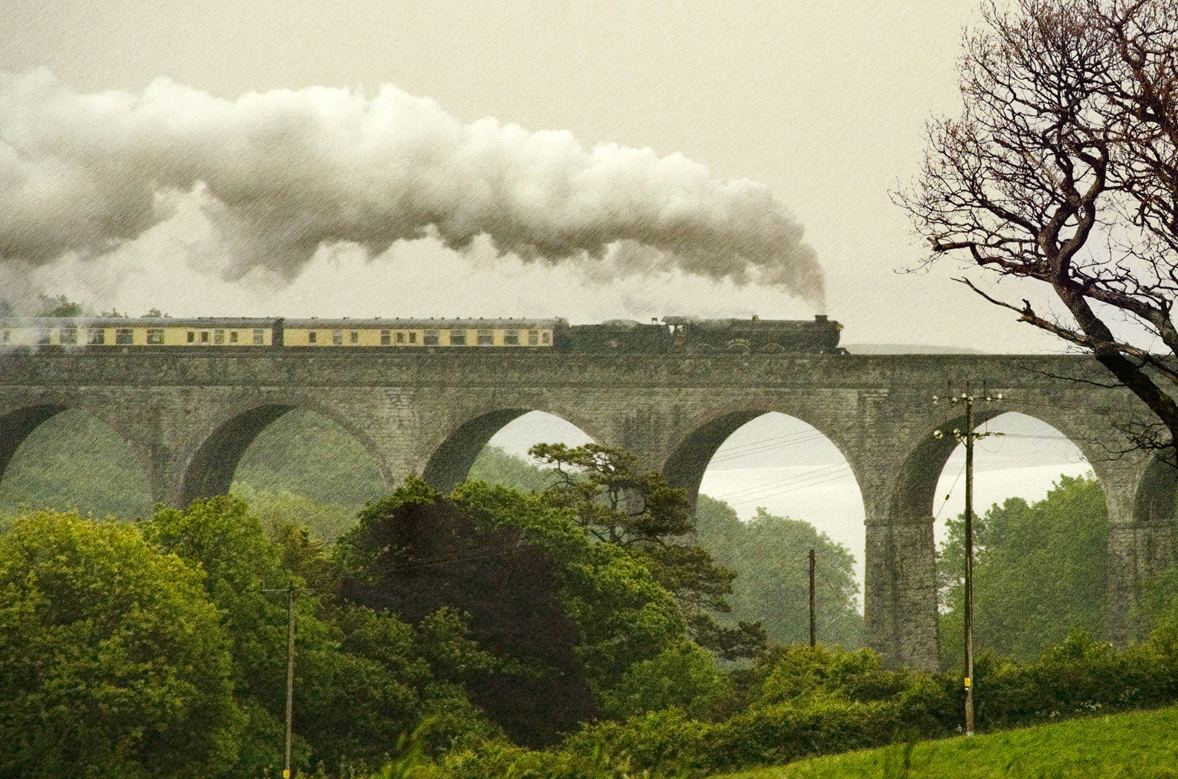
Restored locomotive 6024 King Edward 1 crosses the Porthkerry viaduct near Barry in May 2007.

=== Railways and docks ===
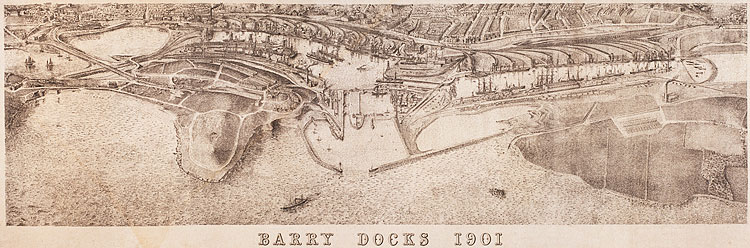
The docks in 1901. The west pond, later filled in, is visible to the left of the No. 1 Dock. The No. 2 Dock is to the right.

Railways totalling 27 miles (43 km) were completed before the docks opened to connect them to the coalfields. At peak, there were 88 miles (142 km) of running tracks and 108 miles (174 km) of single-track sidings, over 1,000 yards (910 m) of viaducts and 2,500 yards (2,300 m) of tunnels, with seventeen stations. The lines had gentle gradients, no more than 1 in 400 against the load on the mainline. The main Barry railway from the docks to the coalfields joined the Rhondda Fawr line of the Taff Vale Railway near Hafod northwest of Pontypridd. There were branch lines that joined the Taff Vale line at Treforest and the Great Western Railway at Peterston-super-Ely and St Fagans. A branch line mainly used for passenger traffic connected Barry to the Taff Vale Railway at Cogan Junction near the Penarth dock station. The railway had two long tunnels and four huge viaducts of steel and masonry. The viaducts at Llanbradach, Penyrheol, Penrhos and Walnut Tree, on the line from Tynycaeau Junction to Barry Junction (B&M) on the former Newport & Brecon Railway, have all since been demolished.

The Porthkerry Viaduct was built for the Vale of Glamorgan Railway (VoGR) and still stands. The stone structure has sixteen arches and is 110 feet (34 m) at the highest point. After some construction difficulties it opened in 1900. The VoGR was a branch line connecting the Barry Railway with the Great Western Railway at Bridgend, but its mainline ran to Coity Junction on the Bridgend-Maesteg line. That branch also incorporated a long and a short tunnel, Porthkerry No.1 and Porthkerry No.2. A link from Tynycaeau Junction on the Cadoxton-Pontypridd mainline, to join the Brecon and Merthyr Railway at Dyffryn Isaf (Barry Junction) in the eastern Rhymney Valley, was authorised in 1898 and opened in 1905. By then, the railway had been extended to 47 miles (76 km) of route.

The dock layout that was originally planned – including the site of the basin entrance and passage – was adjusted as the work progressed to ensure that the foundations rested on hard rock. After the tide had been excluded, pits and borings were made to determine the nature of the bottom. A much narrower dock had been planned, but it was decided to move the south wall further south. A mole was added running along the middle of the dock, which increased the length of the quays. Thirty locomotives were used inside the dock works to carry materials. At its peak there were 3,000 workers on the construction site. In the summer and autumn the work continued day and night, with the site lit by electricity and Wells lights.

=== Completion ===
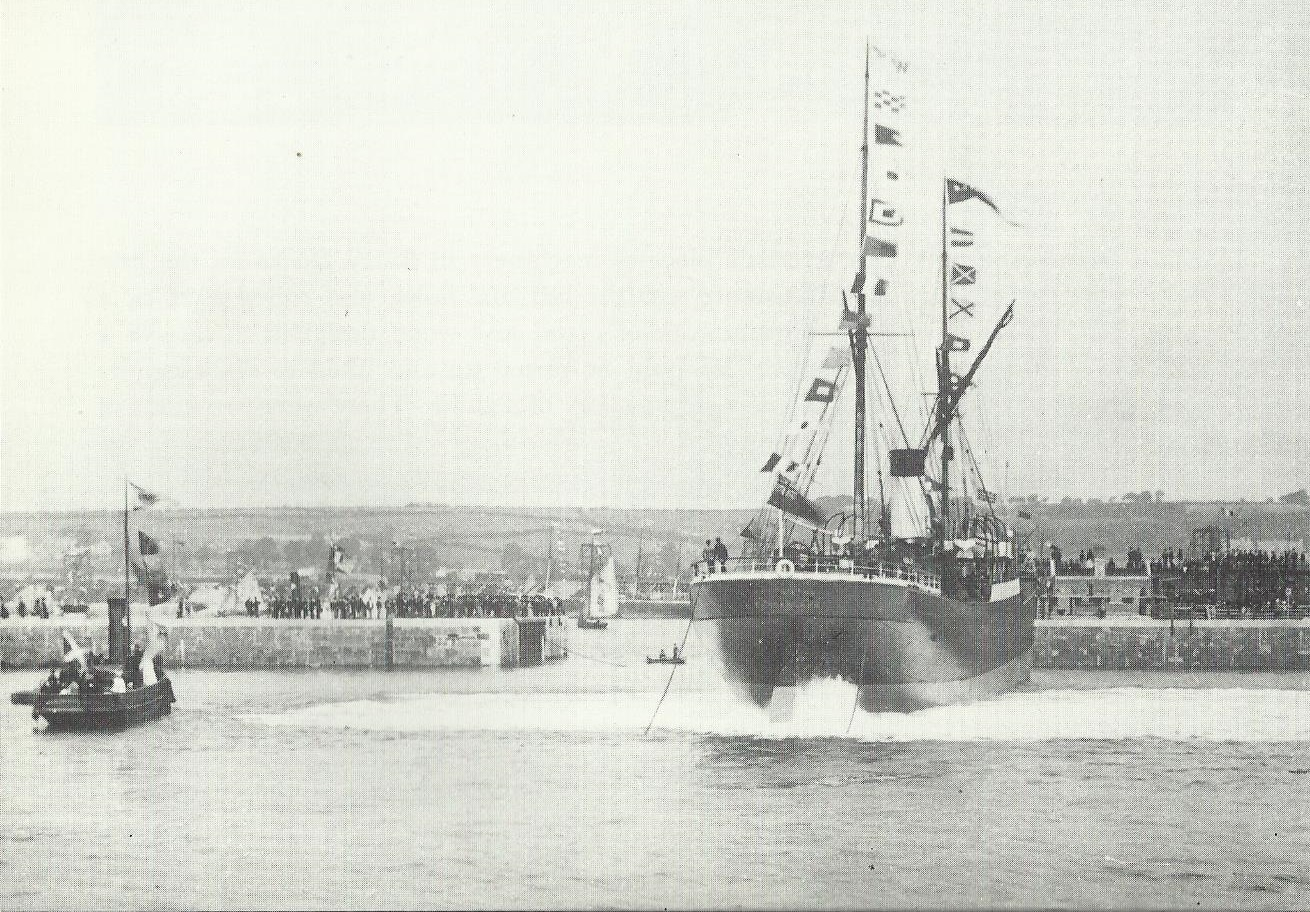
Opening day in 1889

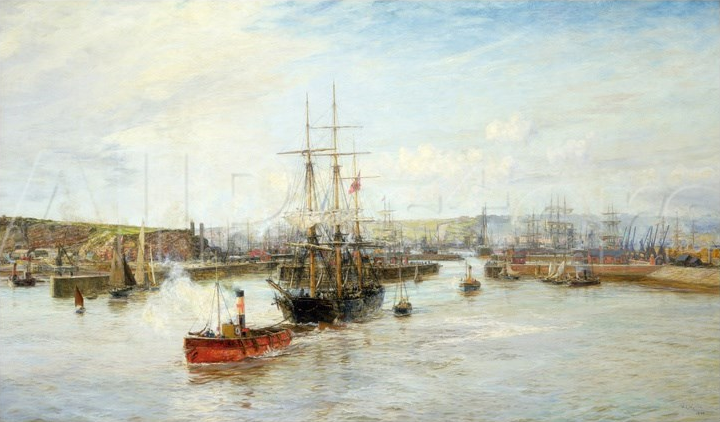
Entrance to Barry Dock (1897) by William Lionel Wyllie

The civil engineer John Wolfe Barry reported that the docks were nearing completion in September 1888. A caisson (Note: The caisson was made of wrought-iron, steel, and timber. It was ship-shaped on one side, flat on the other, and was designed so it could be used for repair work on any of the flat surfaces of the basin or the future lock and graving dock. It was 85 feet (26 m) long, 48.75 feet (14.86 m) deep in the center, and 24 feet (7.3 m) wide amidships.) was built at the sea face of the entrance within the temporary stone dam, fitting against the quoins of the entrance. The stone dam was removed before all the work was completed. Water was let into the docks on 29 June 1889. The water was first admitted into the basin and dock by opening the sluices in the culvert at the entrance on a rising tide. The sluices in the culvert at the west end were also opened. On the first tide the basin and dock were covered with 5 feet (1.5 m) of water, on the next with 18 feet (5.5 m), and on the tide that followed with 23 feet (7.0 m). On 13 July 1889 the caisson was floated and taken into the basin by a tug, and the tide could flow freely through the entrance. The ceremonial opening by Mrs Lewis Davis of Ferndale and David Davies, with 2,000 guests, took place on 18 July 1889. The first vessel, SS Arno, sailed into the dock shortly after the ribbon was cut. Six tips were ready for the opening, and loaded coal into six ships.

In the first phase 5,000,000 cubic yards (3,800,000 m^{3}) had been excavated. 200,000 cubic yards (150,000 m^{3}) of rubble masonry, 10,000 cubic yards (7,600 m^{3}) of brickwork, 110,000 cubic feet (3,100 m^{3}) of ashlar, mostly granite, and 220,000 cubic feet (6,200 m^{3}) of timber work had been used. The docks had a water surface of 107 acres (43 ha) with 242 acres (98 ha) of adjacent quay roads and lands, and 208 acres (84 ha) of land covered by tide, for a total of 557 acres (225 ha). The cost of the first phase of dock construction was about £850,000, including gates and machinery. The total cost of the first phase was £2 million.

No. 2 Dock, to the east of the first dock, was authorised in 1893. Work began in 1894 and was completed in 1898. A further expansion to the docks were completed in 1914. The Docks Office was built in 1897–1900 by the architect Arthur E. Bell at the cost of £59,000. A statue of David Davies by Alfred Gilbert stands in front, unveiled in 1893. The roof and clock tower were destroyed by fire in 1984, but have been carefully restored. The building became the Customs House in 1995. It is now the Dock Office building of the Vale of Glamorgan Council.

== Facilities ==
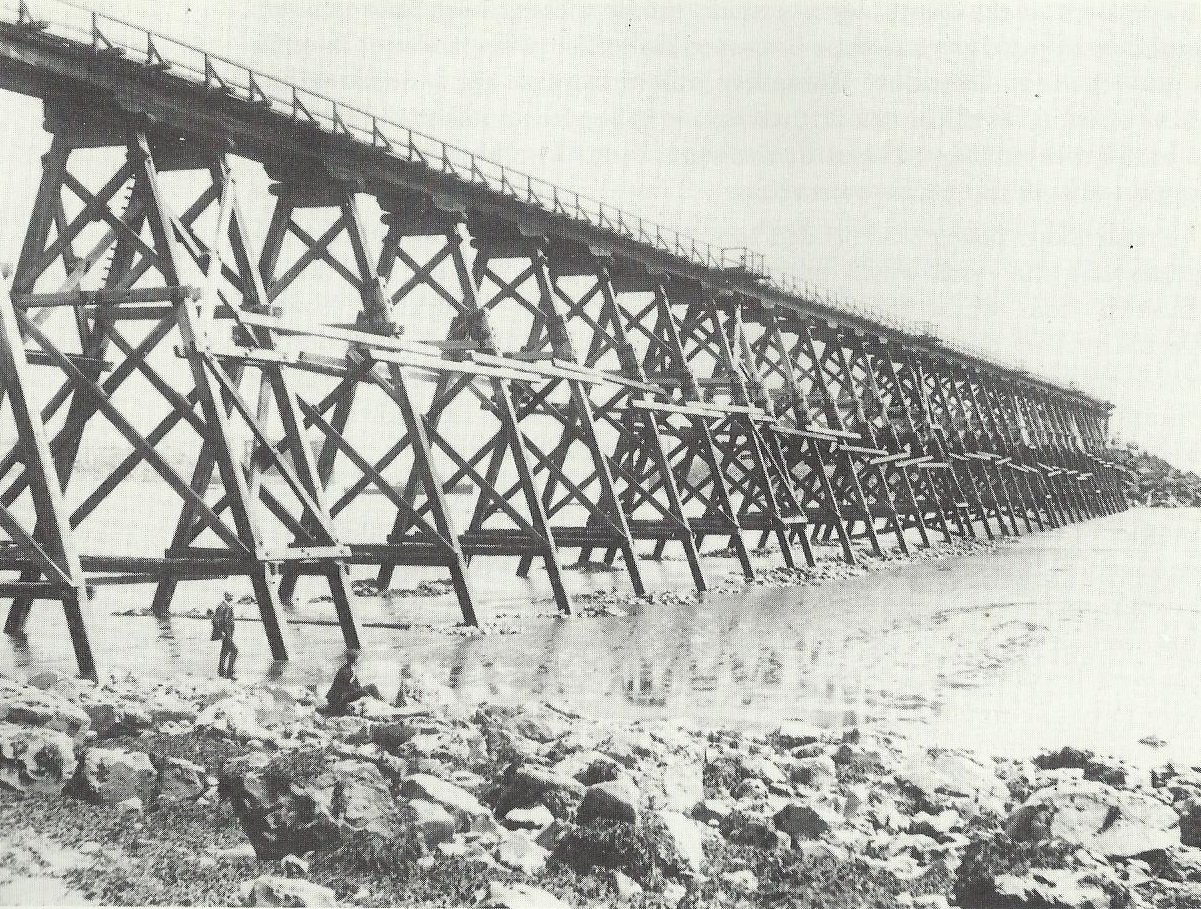
Breakwater under construction

The outer tidal basin, breakwaters and lighthouse (2008)

=== Approach channel ===
The dock entrance is on the east side of Barry Island, which protects it from winds from the west and southwest. Two rubble breakwaters with six-ton stone blocks on the seaward side protect the entrance from winds from other directions. Given the height of the tides, the breakwaters are substantial structures, 46 feet (14 m) high at the deepest part, and 200 feet (61 m) wide at the base. There is a 350 feet (110 m) gap between the breakwaters, from which a dredged channel of 1,455 feet (443 m) leads to the dock basin entrance. The channel has a least depth of 2.5 metres (8 ft 2 in), with a depth of 14 metres (46 ft) at spring tides and 12 metres (39 ft) at neap tides. At high-water spring tides the depth of water at the entrance to the basin is 38 feet (12 m). At high-water neap tides it is 29 feet (8.8 m).

The Barry Docks West Breakwater Light, a white cast-iron tower at the head of the west breakwater, was built in 1890. The tower is 30 feet (9.1 m) high and the focal plane is 40 feet (12 m) high. The light is still operational as a navigation aid.

There are several moorings for yachts and small craft on the west of the tidal basin.

=== Dock basin ===
The original entrance to the docks is 80 feet (24 m) wide, with two wrought-iron gates operated by direct-acting hydraulic cylinders. This sea entrance leads into the Basin (occasionally called No.3 dock), that is 600 by 500 feet (180 by 150 m) and covers 7 acres (2.8 ha). At its northwest end, the Basin is connected to No.1 dock by an 80 feet (24 m) wide passage with another pair of wrought-iron lock gates, so that when required, the Basin can act as a lock, with the water level adjusted according to the rising tide. This enables wide-beamed vessels to leave the basin before high water and to enter the basin after high water.

In its twilight years of vessel movements, the Basin sea locks were only used for vessels of 'above normal' beam, as its entrance was wider than Lady Windsor Lock at 80 feet wide. The walls of the basin are vertical apart from a sharply curved batter at the base, which makes the toe very strong. The foundations are solid and the backfill is high quality so that the pressure on the walls is minimised. The walls are built of mountain limestone faced with hard red sandstone and rest on solid rock. They are 50 feet (15 m) high, 17 feet (5.2 m) thick at the base just above the curve, and 7 feet (2.1 m) thick at the top. The Basin gates contain many sluices, so water can be quickly drained out or let in according to whether the sea level is above or below the prevailing docks water level. However, more water is lost from No.1 dock supply if the Basin water is lowered to the seaward side of the lock gates instead of using the Lady Windsor lock sluices. In the early days, the dock operators would often run the water down to bring in a single ship having a wider beam than the Lady Windsor lock could handle.

=== Lady Windsor Lock ===
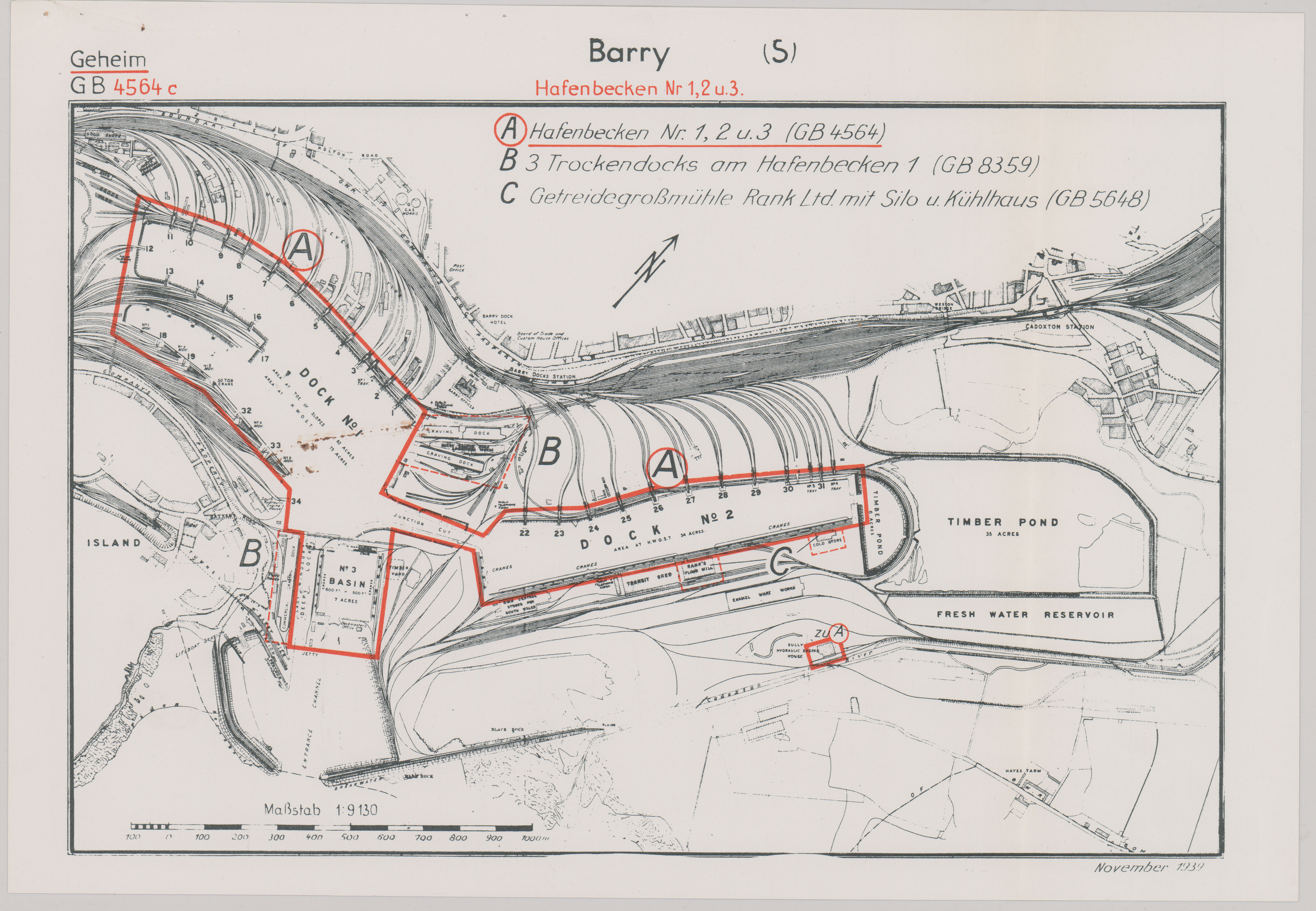
Plan from a target chart of the German Luftwaffe, 1939

At first, the docks were only accessible via the Basin for a few hours during high water. While waiting, ships could anchor to the east of the docks between Barry Island and Sully Island. The Lady Windsor Lock, opened on 4 January 1898, was named after the wife of the chairman of the company. It is 647 by 65 feet (197 by 20 m) and opens into the sea to the west of the Basin. It is 60 feet (18 m) deep and can be divided into two locks, using a gate about one-third of the way from the sea entrance. In its day, Lady Windsor was reportedly the largest and deepest lock in the world. Vessels that draw 13 feet (4.0 m) can enter and leave the dock at low water during ordinary spring tides. Vessels that draw 18 feet (5.5 m) can enter at low water 15 days per month. As of 1924, the channel leading to the lock was dredged to 13 feet (4.0 m). Ships generally use Lady Windsor Lock, whilst the Basin serves as an alternative for large-beamed vessels or in cases where the Lady Windsor lock gates are being repaired.

=== Docks ===
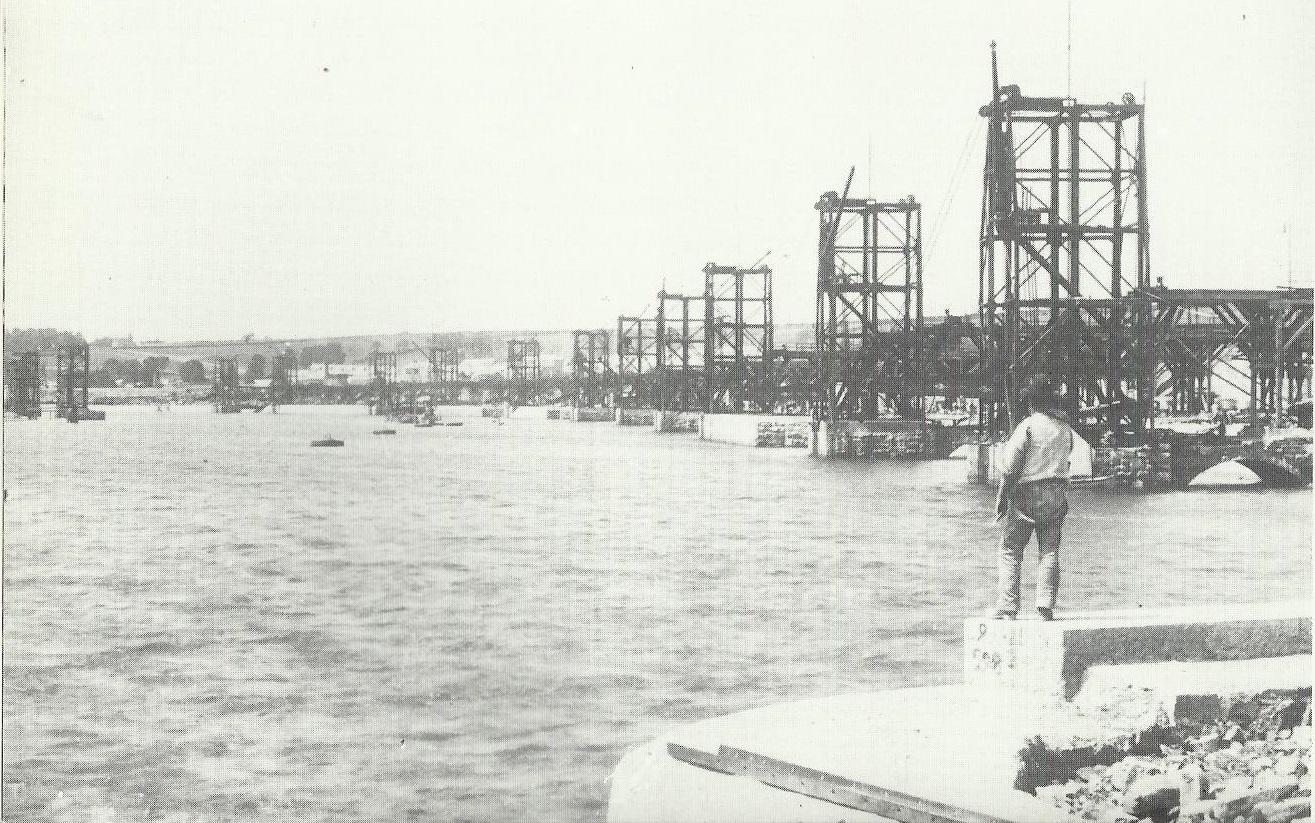
No.1 dock ready for opening (1889)

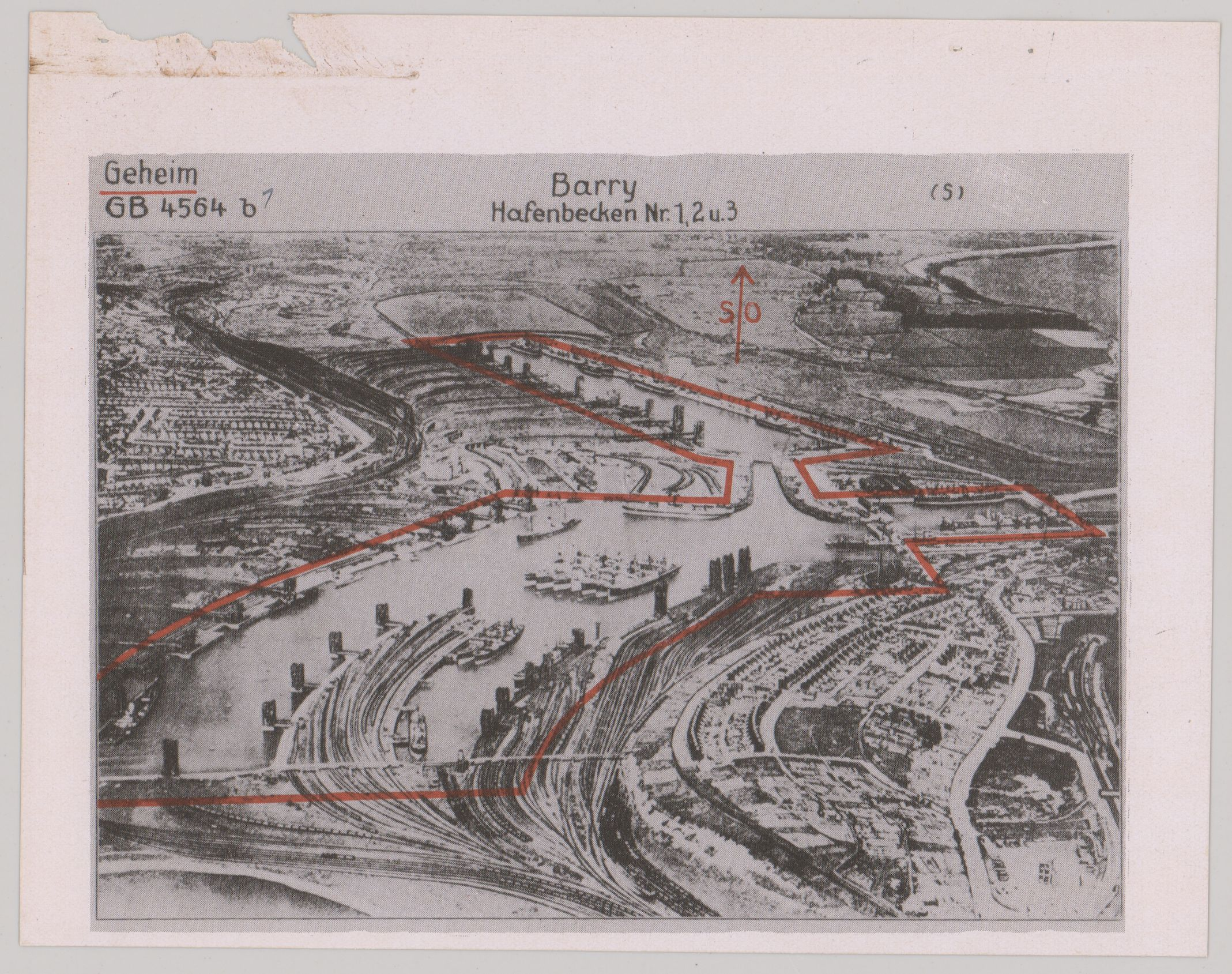
Aerial image of the docks, 1930s

Some 200 acres (81 ha) in total between the island and the mainland were used for docks, quays, sidings and other facilities.

The No.1 dock, the first dock built, is 3,400 by 1,100 feet (1,040 by 340 m) and covers about 70 acres (28 ha). Its western end is divided into two arms by a projecting mole. No. 1 dock has a full width of 1,600 feet (490 m) at the eastern end, so the largest vessels could swing even when the tips and quays were fully occupied. There was a 700 by 100 feet (213 by 30 m) graving dock (dry-dock) at the northeast corner but, due to the Waterfront development in the 1990s, this has been filled in. This commercial graving dock was capable of handling the largest vessels of the day. In 1893, to the east of this, there was a timber pond of 24 acres (9.7 ha) connected to the No.1 dock by a short channel almost parallel with the then dry-dock. This link was later severed and part of its length converted to another dry-dock, with the pond beyond filled in to make way for the necessary high-level rail viaducts and embankments run to the No.2 dock coal hoists. The remaining dry-dock, minus its floatable caisson, is still flooded with the waterline commoned with that of the two docks (July 2017). By 1901, with No.2 dock in use, a second timber pond was included north of the dock. It was partly backfilled after 1960 but intersected by the docks road level crossing (Wimborne Rd) from Cadoxton to the Bendricks. This is a single line rail freight link from Network Rail's Cadoxton station to the No.2 docks quays and southside rail infrastructure. It includes a 180° curve from northwest to the southeast side of the dock, this now being the only rail access to the entire docks area. It serves remaining sidings for the Sully Moors industrial complex, Dow Corning silicone plant, and intermodal rail freight traffic (2017).

There are vertical walls where the fixed and movable tips were installed, and between the tips the north wall of the dock had slopes of 1.75 to 1. This made it easier for ships to come alongside and reduced the amount of overhang needed for tipping. It also allowed overlap of vessels lying at the tips. Strong freshwater springs were encountered when sinking the foundations of the No.10 coal tip. The water was piped to a cast-iron cylinder sunk into the foot of the tip, then pumped up for use by steam locomotives and the new town of Barry. Two of the mole sides are sloped whilst the southeast face is vertically walled. Originally, three sides of the mole served coal hoists and their related rail sidings linking them; there were cranes on the southeast face, also served by rail. The former hoist brick-faced plinths are still present (2017) around the northwest and east faces, as are those on the rest of the two docks. In the twilight years of tanker unloading for the William Cory (Powell Duffryn) oil works, short footbridges were provided from the mole. This enables works staff to access the brick plinths to handle the flexible tanker oil discharge piping and supports, and it was not unknown for rail tank wagons to be in use on the siding serving the northwest Mole face. The bottom of the dock is 20 feet (6.1 m) below mean sea level. Due to the nature of the strata under the dock, there was no need to puddle the bottom of the dock to prevent water from seeping out and damaging the surrounding lands.

The No.2 dock, (often referred to as the "New dock") to the east of No.1 dock, was open and in use by 1898. The first ship to enter No.2 dock was SS Solent when it opened without ceremony on 10 October 1898. John Jackson, a veteran of several major dock and harbour projects including the piers and foundation for Tower Bridge, London, the new Dover Harbour and part of the Manchester Ship Canal, was the contractor for the expansion. No.2 Dock is 3,338 feet (1,017 m) long and 400 to 600 feet (120 to 180 m) wide, connected to No.1 dock via a narrowing channel from west to east, It was latterly bridged by a hydraulically operated road/rail swingbridge; this was removed after 1999. Dock walls 46.5 feet (14.2 m) high were built of large limestone blocks at the loading points. The tall hydraulic hoists have since been demolished.

=== Machinery and labour ===
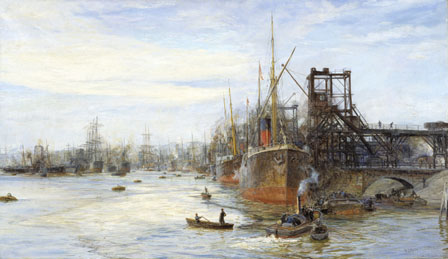
Barry Docks c. 1900 by William Lionel Wyllie showing a ship at a tip station

The initial plans allowed for loading coal onto vessels from eleven high-level coal tips and four cranes on the north side of the dock, from five low-level tips on the Mole and from one tip at the west end of the dock. There was space for additional tips on the Mole, the south side of the dock and the basin. Hydraulic pressure was used to operate all the machinery, supplied by three engine houses (Barry, at the north-west side of No.1 dock, Battery Hill, and Bendricks, to the south-east of No.2 dock). An engineers' report of 1901 contained the following extract:

The tips have lifts of 37, 42, and 45 feet, and are each capable of lifting 20 tons. All tips are provided with two weigh-bridges, one on the full and the other on the empty roads. The machinery at the docks is worked by hydraulic power obtained at three engine-houses, which contain nine pairs of compound, horizontal, surface-condensing engines, with cylinders of 16 inches and 28 inches diameter and 24 inches stroke, indicating 250 H.P. per pair. Steam is supplied at 80 lbs. per square inch by twenty-five Lancashire boilers, 28 feet long by 7 feet diameter. The pressure-pumps are of the differential-ram principle, and maintain a pressure in the mains of 750 lbs. per square inch. The whole of the docks, coal-tips, sidings, etc., are lighted by electricity.

Battery Hill pumphouse at Barry Island was demolished after 1945, but the main part of the Bendricks building (referred to as the "Sully hydraulic engine house" in R. A. Cooke's section 44b GWR track diagrams) lived on until just after the Millennium. Ironically, with the nationalisation of the former 'big four' railway groups to become British Railways (BR) in 1947, the Barry Railway initials survive on one of the gables at Barry Island railway station and the initials BR appeared in white bricks on the northwest facet of the taper-square chimney of the Bendricks pumphouse, until its demolition. By 1947, two hydraulic accumulators were located adjacent to the No. 1 Dock hydraulic and electricity generating house and the Barry Railway Company's loco works, southwest of the dock, one at the junction of Subway Road and the low-level docks through road and level crossing near what was the General HQ of the Barry Railway Company and what is now the Vale of Glamorgan Council Civil Office building, one north of the now removed 'New cut' swingbridge and south of the former Graving Dock Junction and level crossing, one at the cross-link road from Cadoxton to the Bendricks, north of No. 2 dock and one at the foot of the steps of the former shortened and later removed Clive Road, Barry Island footbridge to No. 1 dock. Their function was to back up and stabilise fluctuating hydraulic pressure as the coal hoists and other users were working. (Most of these are detectable from aerial photographs taken between 1921 and 1929 and can be seen on other websites.) One pair of fixed coal hoists on the north side was 174 feet (53 m) apart, and two other pairs were 200 feet (61 m) apart. This spacing was chosen since it was the same as that in the Cardiff docks, and ships had been built to match the spacing so they could be loaded at two positions simultaneously.

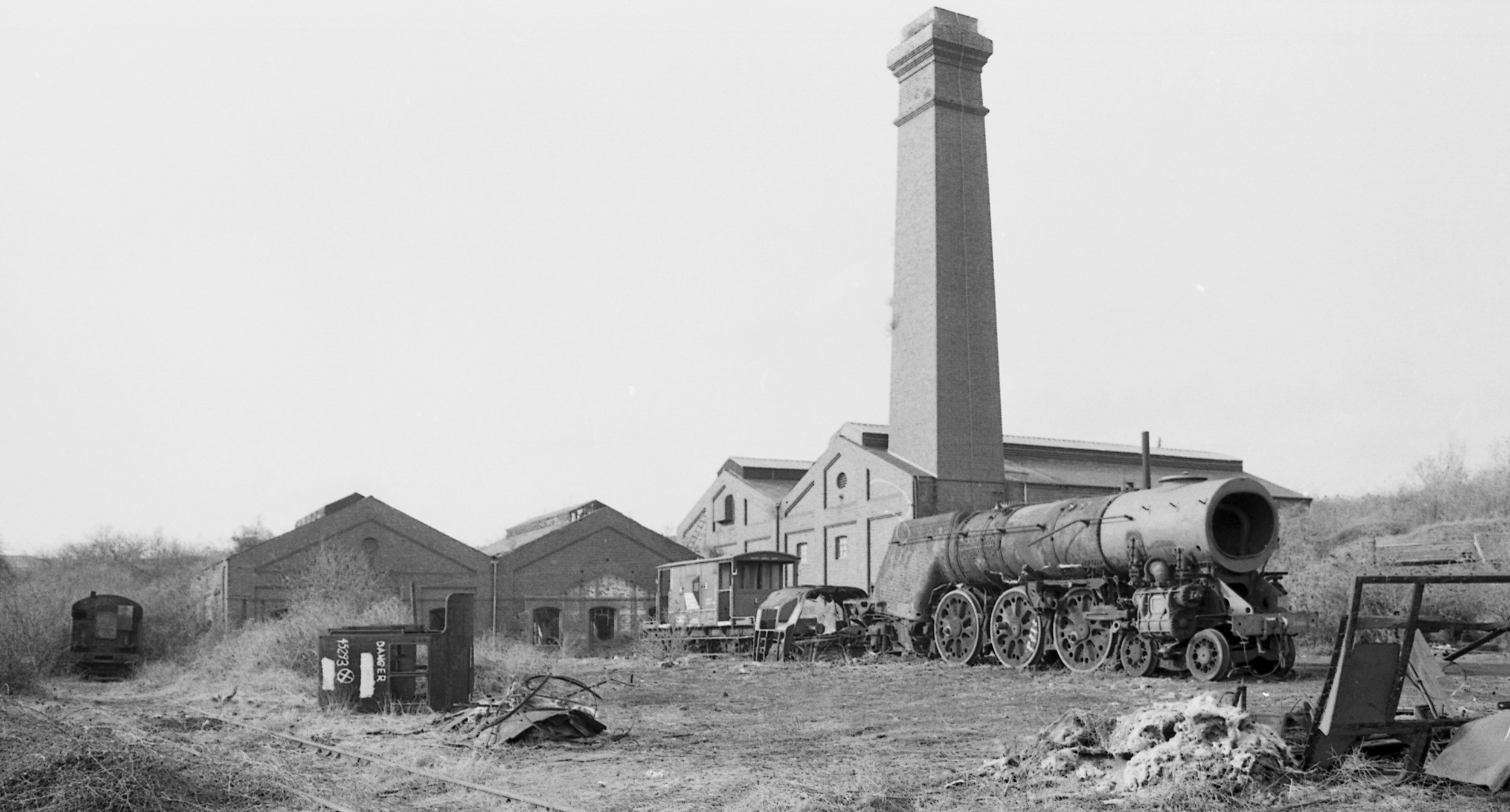
Barry hydraulic pumphouse, with Woodham's yard in the foreground

The coal tipping cranes, (referred to as coal-tips, hoists or 'staiths' by the Barry Railway Company) were elevated well above water level. After being weighed, a loaded wagon, which would hold about 10 long tons (10 t) of coal, was pulled from the weighbridge onto a raisable or lowerable cradle at the hoist to suit the coal chute and a vessel's open hold. The cradle was held within a tower, and usually had a downhill gradient railtrack of 1 in 233 towards the weighbridge but a 1 in 70 downhill incline out. The cradle could also be raised or lowered as the dock water level varied. Using hydraulic power, the cradle was tilted to an angle, so the coal ran out of the wagon and down a coal chute into the hold of the vessel below. At the start of loading, the coal would run into a suspended anti-breakage box, which was hydraulically lowered into the hold and emptied through a hinged flap at the bottom. As loading proceeded, a cone of coal built up below the anti-breakage box until it reached the height of the end of the chute. At this stage, the anti-breakage box was swung out of the way and the coal allowed to run directly down the chute and down the sides of the cone at its angle of repose. Coal trimmers in the hold would level the coal. (Note: The coal trimmer job had health hazards. Harold Finch, compensation secretary of the South Wales Miners' Federation, pointed this out the Medical Research Council when it conducted an inquiry into silicosis in 1937–42. His father-in-law and brother-in-law, both coal trimmers in the Barry Docks, had both died of Miner's Lung.)

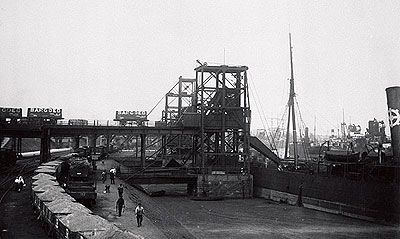
Coal tip at the No. 1 Dock in 1913

The empty wagon would be winched off the cradle and run down onto a second weighbridge to calculate the tare and then run down a gradient of 1 in 70 to the 'empties' siding. Local hydraulic capstans were included to rope-haul wagons to and from the cradle as necessary. The empty wagons would then be shunted to the sorting sidings. Two men could empty a wagon in one minute, one to run the wagon on and off the cradle, and another to operate the hydraulics. The resident engineer reported in 1890 that as much as 400 long tons (410 t) had been shipped in one hour from a single tip. In 1890 movable tipping hoists mounted on rails were installed so that coal could be loaded simultaneously into one hold from a fixed hoist and another hold from the movable hoist. The original tipping hoists were made by Tennant and Walker of Leeds. The design was a compromise between the demand for speed in loading and the cost of breakage of coal delivered into the holds from a height.

Barry had a good reputation for the quick turn-around of ships, attributed to the "lavish provision of approach lines and storage sidings", and the skill of the shunters (who ensured that every yard of storage capacity of the ships was utilised), the tippers (who tipped the coal onto the ships), and the trimmers (who shovelled the coal sideways until the coal was evenly distributed in the hold). The tippers usually worked in gangs of four, and the dock charges and the wages of the tippers and the trimmers were based on tonnage. The wages of the shunters and the tippers were paid by the Barry Railway Company, and the wages of the trimmers were paid by the colliery companies.

== History ==
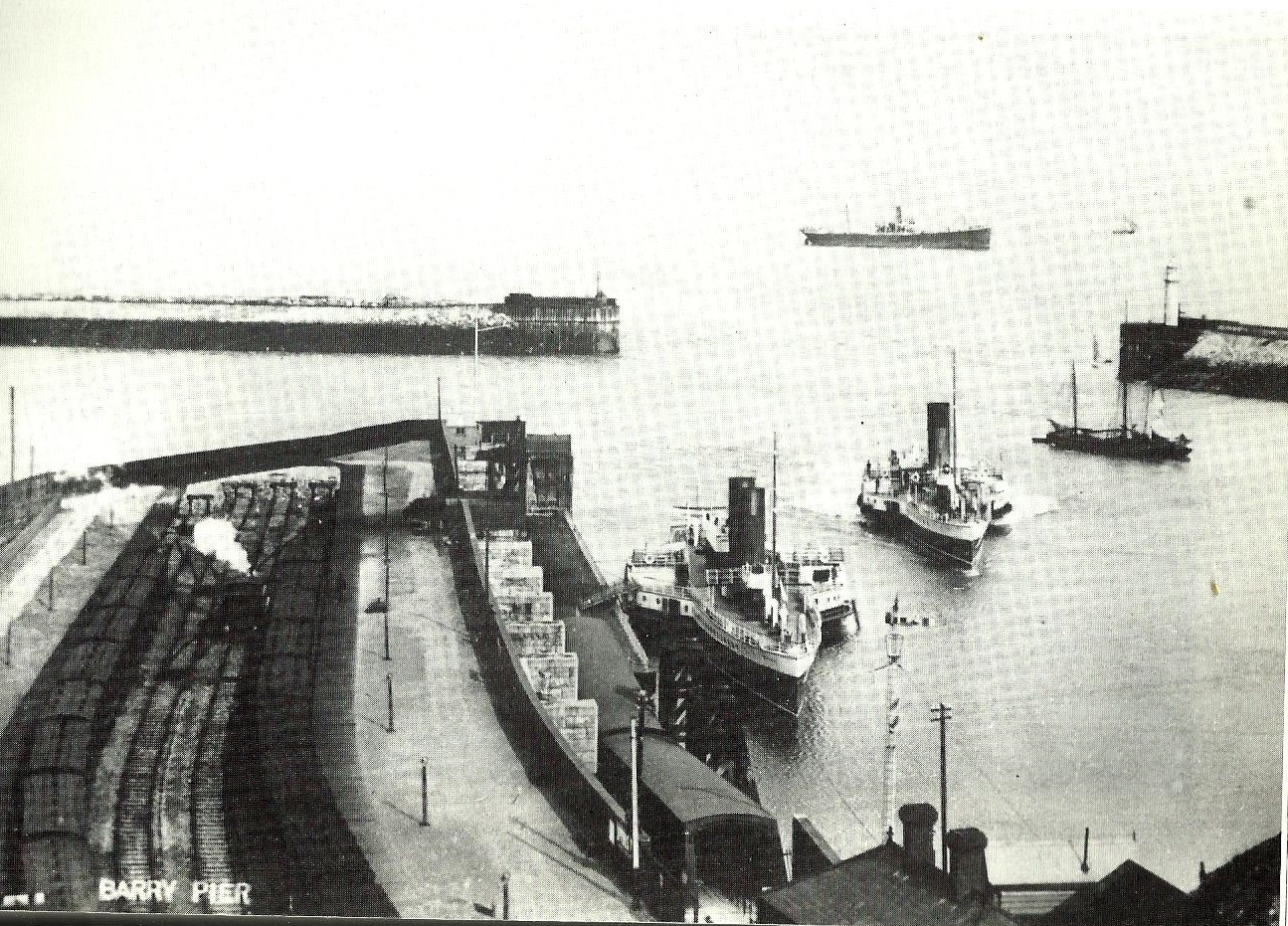
Harbour entrance, Barry Island, paddle steamers of the P & A Campbell fleet (c. 1908)

=== Boom years ===
There was a coal boom between 1890 and 1914, and the dockyard business was immediately successful. By the end of 1889 Barry had exported 1.073 million long tons (1,090,000 t). In 1890 the docks shipped 3.192 million long tons (3,243,000 t). In 1891 the Barry Dock and Railway Company was renamed the Barry Railway Company. The chairman was Lord Windsor, who owned much of the land. David Davies was deputy chairman and responsible for running the company. 3,000 ships used the dock in 1899, taking 7 million long tons (7,100,000 t) of coal. In 1903 the docks shipped 9 million long tons (9,100,000 t). Only 10% of the coal went to other ports in Britain and Ireland. Most went overseas for use in steam engines. The main export markets were France, the Mediterranean, the Black Sea, West Africa and South America. Smokeless Welsh coal exported from Barry Docks was in great demand by the Royal Navy at their stations all over the world.

In 1896 a spur line was built to a new railway station on the Barry Island, which quickly developed as a day trip resort with eating places, shops, and in 1912 a funfair with rides. P & A Campbell started to operate paddleboat cruises from a pier at the Barry Docks entrance tidal harbour, and were followed by cruises run by the Barry Railway Company. Peter and Alex Campbell of Penarth bought the Barry Railway's Red Funnel Paddle Steamers in 1911.

Aside from coal, Barry exported timber and small quantities of pig iron, wood, pulp, silver sand, zinc, and iron ore. A timber business was started in the town in 1888 by J. C. Meggitt of Wolverhampton, and in the 1890s gypsum, railway sleepers, flints, and rice began to be exported. The Barry Company made a considerable effort to attract firms to the dock area, but with limited success. Although J. Arthur Rank, a milling company which produced flour and animal stuffs, was established in 1906 on the dockside, an attempt by the Barry Company in 1910 and 1911 to make an agreement with Lord Ashby St. Ledger to open up land on the eastern dock area towards Sully to host steel manufacturers from the Midlands proved fruitless.

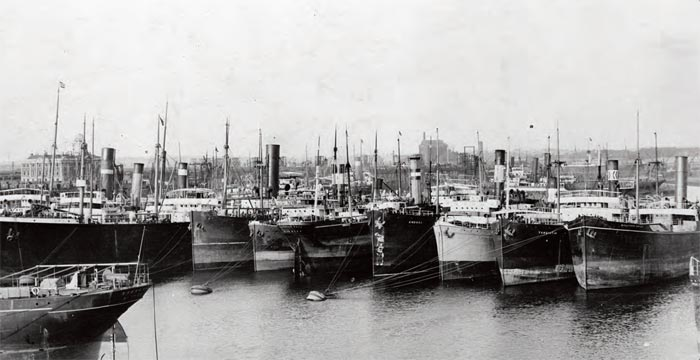
Ships moored, ready to load coal (1910)

In 1909 between 8,000 and 10,000 men were employed in the docks. The town had a population of about 33,000, almost all of them dockworkers, their families, or tradesmen and others supplying their needs. In 1913, Cardiff lost its title as the largest port in the world for coal exports when Barry shipped 11.05 million long tons (11,230,000 t) compared to Cardiff's 10.6 million long tons (10,800,000 t). The trade in 1913 was dominated by exports of coal, carried by increasingly large and efficient vessels. Imports were just 11% of total volume in 1913, the largest category being iron ore. The company fought off competition and was able to pay dividends of 9.5% and 10%.

At the docks, the company ran a total of 41 tips of various kinds, 47 mooring buoys, and kept tugs, launches, a dredger, a firefloat, and even had its own diver and police force. When World War I (1914–18) began, the government took control of all the railways and docks. There was a boom in employment as the docks continued to export coal but also exported timber and hay, imported grain and loaded naval vessels with equipment, munitions and supplies. 20-ton wagons were introduced during World War I, and later 30 ton. By 1920, the Barry Railway Company had a workforce of 3169, of which 890 were unskilled labourers, and operated 148 steam locomotives, 194 carriages and brake vans, and 2,316 wagons and trucks.

=== Decline ===
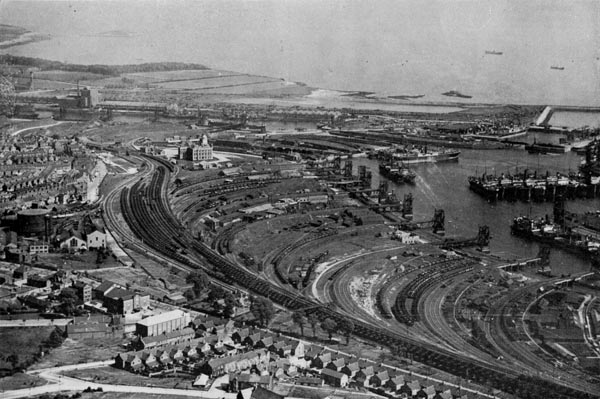
Barry No. 1 Dock from the Great Western Railway Magazine, July 1922. The spur lines curve into the tip stations.

The Railways Act 1921 forced a consolidation of the railways into four systems that lasted until 1947, when the railways were nationalised. The Barry Railway Company was merged with the Great Western Railway (GWR) the next year. By this time it had tracks covering 68 miles (109 km) of route, and large amounts of equipment. In addition to coal wagons the company ran suburban passenger services. W. Waddell, general manager of the Barry, became assistant to the chief of the GWR docks department. The acquisition made the GWR the world's largest dock owner. With ports in Barry, Cardiff, Swansea, Newport, Penarth and Port Talbot the GWR shipped over 50 million long tons (51,000,000 t) each year, three-quarters of which was South Wales coal.

There was a short boom in 1923, after which GWR made heavy investments in adapting the hoists and tips in its docks and sidings to handle the 20-ton wagon, but the collieries were often unwilling to adopt the new size despite offers of rebates. 1923 proved to be the post-war peak. Coal output in Wales dropped from a total of 57.4 million long tons (58,300,000 t) that year to 37.7 million long tons (38,300,000 t) in 1928, and continued to fall as ships converted from coal to oil.

In May 1926 GWR was involved in the General Strike of mineworkers, continuing to run trains during the strike while miners had downed tools. This caused resentment that lasted for many years. The mines remained closed until the winter of 1926, causing a severe loss to GWR, which was also starting to feel competition from road transport. In October 1929 the Wall Street crash heralded the start of the Great Depression. In 1926 the freight line from Penrhos South Junction to Barry Junction (B&M) was closed. In 1930 through passenger traffic from Tonteg Junction to Pontypridd Craig and Hafod Junction ceased but freight continued until 1951, when that section was closed, following which traffic was diverted to run to Treforest Junction from Tonteg Junction until the entire branch closed in 1963. By 1935 export volumes of the GWR ports were 55% of the 1923 peak and import volumes were 63% of the 1923 peak. The next year GWR "temporarily" closed the port of Penarth.

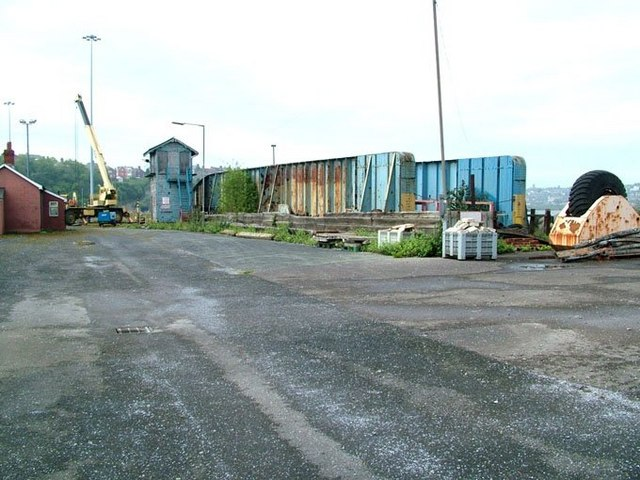
Hydraulically operated rolling bridge built by the Darlington Carriage and Wagon Works, now moribund. It crossed the passage between No.1 Dock and the basin, carrying a single line railway track. Two were established, the other for bridging the Lady Windsor lock. Along with its control building (often referred to as a signal box) it is now a listed structure.

During World War II (1939–45) the Barry Docks were used to import war material. A ring of barrage balloons protected the docks. One was located on the mole and another beside the Barry Island Station. The US Army built a large camp in the spring of 1942 to house troops that serviced the docks. The 517 Port Battalion, with about 1,000 men in four companies, had moved to Hayes Lane Camp in Barry by September 1943. Three companies worked at the Barry docks, discharging cargo, while the fourth moved to Cardiff. The Americans imported vast amounts of food through the Cardiff and Barry Docks to feed their troops. The quantity and quality of the imported food caused some resentment from the local people, who were making do with wartime rations.

In the first part of 1944, there was intense activity in preparation for the Normandy landings. The Barry docks were an embarkation point for troops in the second and later waves of this invasion. Porthkerry Park was used as a vehicle park and ordnance store. 15,000 long tons (15,000 t) of equipment, including 1,269 vehicles, and 4,000 troops were carried from the Docks to Normandy. After the invasion, coal was carried from Barry to liberated ports in France.

Under the Transport Act 1947 the British Transport Commission was created, taking over all the railways, buses, canals, and port facilities in Britain. The Geest company used the docks to import West Indian bananas from 1959 until the 1980s. After they ended this operation, the port continued to decline. The British Transport Docks Board (BTDB) was created under the Transport Act 1962, assuming control of the ports including Barry. In September 1962 the passenger railway service from Barry to Pontypridd was terminated. Goods service at stations was cancelled in April 1964, but the through-line was officially closed in July 1963 following the devastating fire at the Tynycaeau Junction signal box in March 1963. Shipments of coal from the port ceased in 1976, and in November 1981 the last coal tip was taken down. In 1981 Associated British Ports (ABP) took control of the 19 ports that BTDB still owned, under the Transport Act 1981. ABP is a statutory corporation controlled by a company named Associated British Ports Holdings Plc, and is the largest single port operator in Britain. As of 2013 it owned 22 ports including Barry.

=== Scrapyard ===
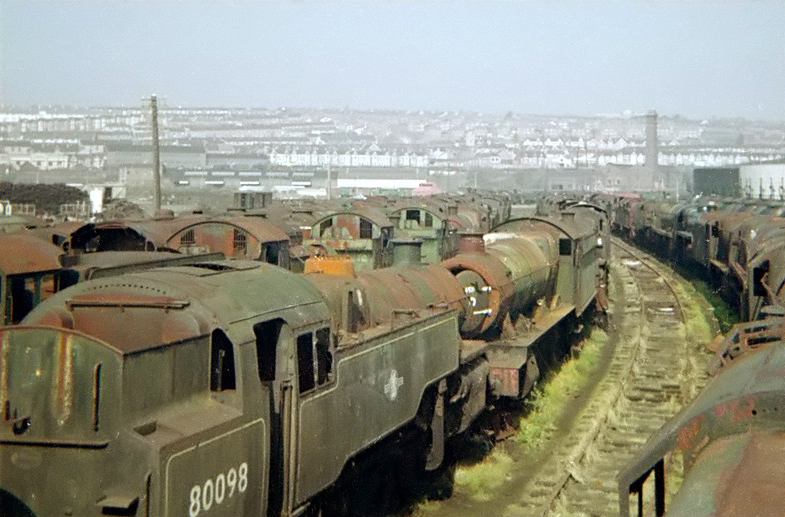
Woodham's Yard in the 1970s

Woodham & Sons was founded in 1892 by Albert Woodham, based at Thompson Street, Barry. The company started as a dock porterage business, and in the late 1930s moved into road transport and scrap. A modernisation programme by British Railways began in 1957. 650,000 wagons and 16,000 steam locomotives were to be scrapped. In 1957 Woodham's began taking wagons and locomotives for scrap, and stored increasing numbers of wagons and locomotives on low-level sidings beside the oil terminal and on new sidings built on reclaimed land where the West Pond had been filled in.

Woodham's concentrated on scrapping the wagons, since locomotives were harder to cut up, and expected to start on the locomotives when the supply of wagons dried up. By August 1968 Woodham's had bought 297 locomotives, of which 217 were still held at the scrapyard. Starting in 1968, preservationists began buying the locomotives, which Dai Woodham sold at their scrap metal value. More than 200 steam locomotives were bought between 1968 and 1989 for preservation.

== Recent years ==
=== Urban development ===
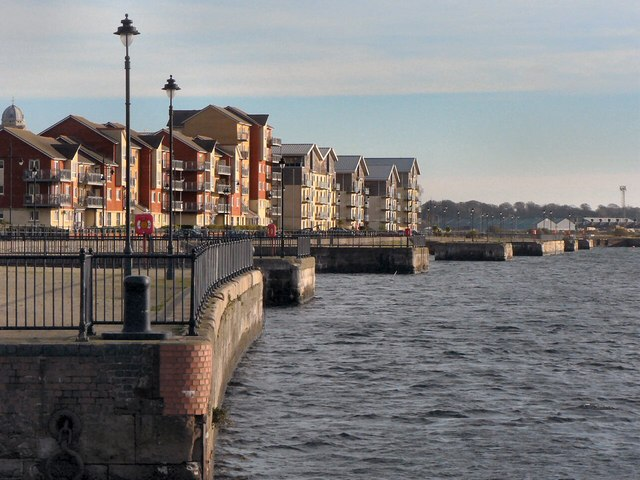
Waterfront development at the original dock, which is no longer operational

A Butlins holiday camp was opened on the island on the headland at Nell's Point in 1966. It was sold to Majestic Holidays in 1987, renamed Majestic Barry Island, and reopened in May 1987. The Wales Tourist Board provided assistance to the Barry Island resort in 1988. The holiday camp closed in 1996, and in 2005 planning permission was given to convert the campsite into a housing estate. The funfair on the Island is still in use as of 2019, having been closed for a couple of years but more recently re-opened with many new attractions.

In 1993 the Barry Joint Venture was launched by the Vale of Glamorgan Borough Council, Welsh Development Agency, and the now-defunct South Glamorgan County Council, later renamed the Barry Action Venture Partnership. The main objective was to redevelop the waterfront around the number one dock, which was now derelict. During the period when the West Pond area was being used for industrial purposes, its soil became contaminated with mercury, asbestos, and cadmium. As part of the clean-up, it was proposed to line the two disused graving docks with an impervious synthetic membrane and fill them with the contaminated soil. In 1995 a court ruled in favour of this plan.

Planning permission was given for a series of major commercial and residential housing developments at Waterfront Barry. In 2001, Morrisons opened a new branch at the site, and a 55,000 square feet (5,100 m^{2}) non-food retail park adjacent to the site was completed by 2004. By 2015, the retail park hosted Pets at Home, Halfords, Argos, Pet Hut, Poundstretcher and a KFC outlet. The fifth stage of the residential developments, a group of new apartments on David's Wharf, was announced in 2002. By 2011 there were 686 new homes, a health centre, pharmacy, supermarket and 5,600 square feet (520 m^{2}) of shopping space. In 2007 a £350 million project was announced to develop 2,000 new homes and commercial properties in the waterfront area. The proposed development included the West Pond reclaimed land to the west of the number one dock, the South Quay, East Quay, and Arno Quay. A£230 million version of the plan was approved in 2011, which included a new road linking the town centre to Barry Island, a school, hotel, restaurants, a supermarket, and public spaces. By 2008, the first of two new medical centres had been built south of the Barry-Cardiff railway line and opposite Thompson Street. To complement these developments, in December 2009 a new pedestrian footbridge was opened that spans the railway line and links Thompson Street with the medical centre, new Waterfront housing, and retail outlets such as the Morrisons. In 2010, construction began on the second medical centre and attached pharmacy that would become known as the Westquay Medical Centre, as well as pedestrian ramped access. The new surgery was opened at the end of October 2010. Like the (by then) Entrepreneurial Centre already established alongside, the building stood on the site of the former Barry Railway Company's loco works and carriage sheds and on a level above the hydraulic engine house. In February 2012, work had started on clearing the site opposite the old hydraulic engine house in preparation for building a new hotel which by June 2014 was open to the public as the Premier Inn and Brewers Fayre pub and carvery. Further drastic change came in April 2015 when a new Asda supermarket and petrol station was opened that occupied most of the land previously bearing the Powell Duffryn oil tank farm as well as former multiple railway sidings used latterly for storage of withdrawn steam locomotives held by Dai Woodham. The extant structure of the 'listed' hydraulic engine house opposite the Premier Inn, partly renovated prior to 2012, was involved in further internal renovation and facial improvements, with car parking facilities beginning construction in August 2015. Later, its tapered square chimney was fitted with black vertical lettering on two faces; One facet shows PUMPHOUSE, and one shows TY PWMP, both being backlit during darkness. Initially, the necessary circumflex above the letter Y in the Welsh language had not been fitted to the latter lettering. An Espresso bar had been opened within the main building and the complimentary car park by December 2015.

=== Commercial operations ===
Docks in 2010

By the end of the 20th century the docks were no longer used to export coal, although there was some traffic in coke. As of 2014 the docks were being operated by ABP and covered a total port acreage of 531 acres (215 ha). The docks are connected by a link road to the M4 motorway, and are linked to the regional railway network, with terminal facilities for handling containers. They also had cranes, mechanical handling equipment and a weighbridge. Roll-on/roll-off vessels could use stern and three-quarter ramp discharge. There were more than 14,000 square metres (150,000 sq ft) of warehouse space, and large areas of outdoor storage. There were facilities for 45,000 cubic metres (1,600,000 cu ft) of liquid bulk storage.

The Barry chemicals complex is situated beside the Barry Docks, as are industrial estates such as the Atlantic Trading Estate, between Barry and Sully. In 2007 the Docks handled 456,000 tonnes (449,000 long tons; 503,000 short tons) of cargo, of which 370,000 tonnes (360,000 long tons; 410,000 short tons) was chemicals. The docks were being used to handle liquid chemicals for companies such as Dow Corning. The port also had equipment for handling dry cargoes such as scrap metal, steel, coal, cement, and aggregates. It was being used for the import of timber from Scandinavia and the Baltics. In 2010 the Barry docks handled 281,000 tonnes (277,000 long tons; 310,000 short tons) of cargo. In 2012 the Docks directly employed 23 full-time employees, but this does not include people working as crews on the dredging vessels or pilots based at Barry. The docks had 114 tenants in 2003, which had fallen to 103 tenants in 2007.

In June 2014 it was reported that the Vale of Glamorgan Council had ruled that there was no need for an extensive environmental assessment of a solar farm planned by ABP for an unused part of the dock. The solar farm would be built on two brownfield sites and would cover a 51 acres (21 ha) area. Power would be delivered directly to businesses in and around the port, with the surplus fed into the grid. The £5M solar farm was ultimately constructed; the 20-acre site was operational by August 2015 and can provide 4.5MWh of electricity.

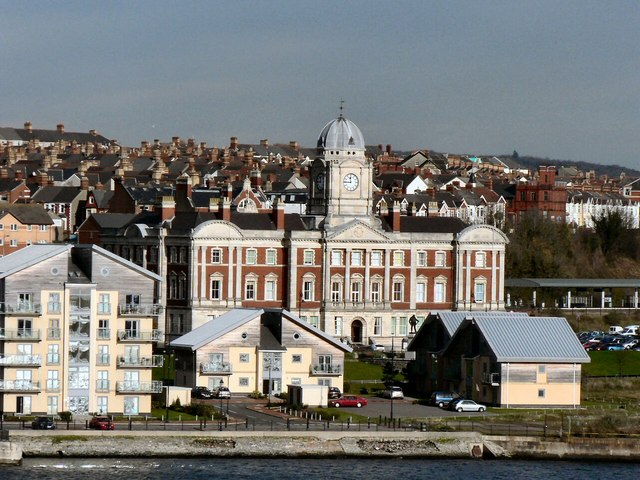
Barry Dock Offices in 2008

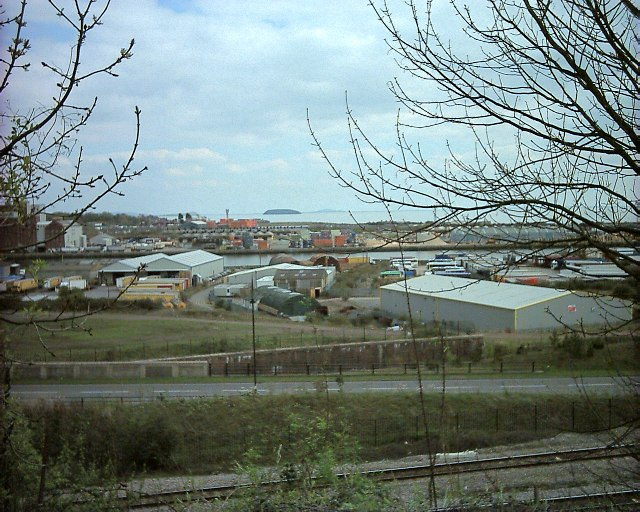
View from Barry in 2004

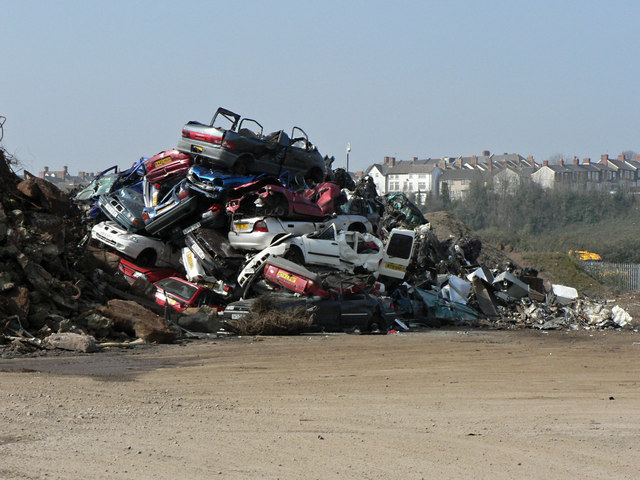
Scrap vehicles and rusting metal at Barry Docks in March 2009

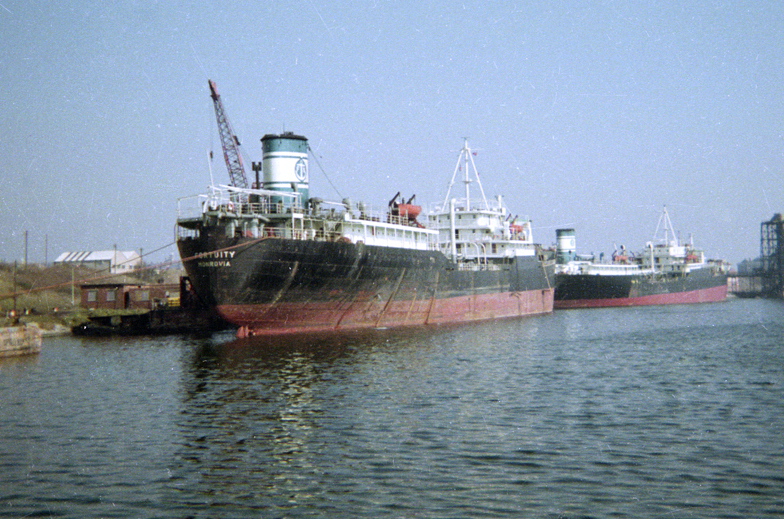
Laid-up shipping in No.1 dock, pre-1981

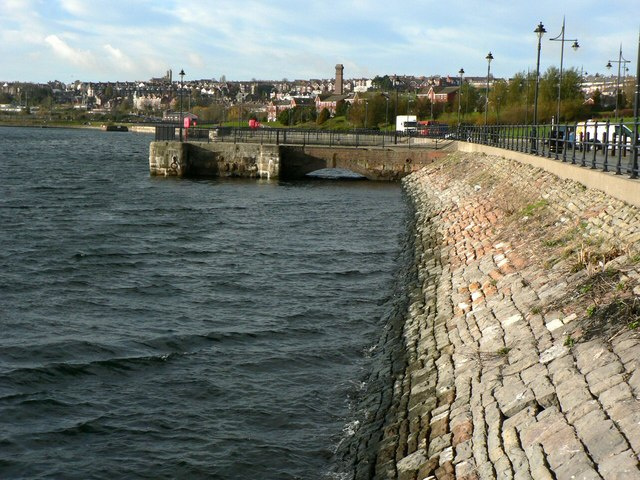
Sea wall and former tip station

== Sources ==
- £230m Barry waterfront house and shops plan approved, BBC News, 7 July 2011
- Ashworth, William (5 November 2013). An Economic History of England 1870–1939. Routledge. ISBN 978-1-136-58643-9.
- "Barry". ABP.
- "Barry Docks West Breakwater Light". Lighthouse Digest Magazine. Foghorn publishing.
- "Barry Island". Bygone Butlins.
- Barry Waterfront Consortium (August 2009). "Barry Waterfront Public Consultation Statement" (PDF).
- Blake, Aled (9 October 2007). "Eco Homes Will Now Sparkle on the Once-Bleak Barry Waterfront". Western Mail. Archived from the original on 21 September 2014.
- Bloor, Michael (February 2000). "The South Wales Miners Federation, Miners' Lung and the Instrumental Use of Expertise, 1900–1950". Social Studies of Science. 30 (1). Published by: Sage Publications: 125–140. doi:10.1177/030631200030001005. JSTOR 285772. PMID 11624678. S2CID 22833168.
- Breverton, Terry (28 February 2013). The Welsh: The Biography. Amberley Publishing Limited. ISBN 978-1-4456-1572-1.
- Bryan, Tim (2010). The Great Western Railway. Osprey Publishing. ISBN 978-0-7478-0788-9.
- Carne, J.E. (1891). "Progress Report for 1890 by J.E, Carne, F.G.S., Curator and Mineralogist". Annual Report – New South Wales. Dept. of Mines.
- Carradice, Phil (14 November 2011). "The birth of Barry Docks". BBC Wales.
- Carradice, Phil (28 February 2014). Cardiff and the Vale in WW1. Amberley Publishing Limited. ISBN 978-1-4456-1758-9.
- Channon, Geoffrey (Summer 1981). "The Great Western Railway under the British Railways Act of 1921". The Business History Review. 55 (2). The President and Fellows of Harvard College: 188–216. doi:10.2307/3114895. JSTOR 3114895. S2CID 154396620.
- Chapman, Colin (1998). The Vale of Glamorgan Railway. Oakwood Press & Video Library. ISBN 978-0-85361-523-1.
- Collins, Peter (21 June 2014). "Plans to build a solar farm at Barry docks take a step forward". Wales Online.
- "Court Backs Council in Barry Docks Waste Disposal Case". Local Government Chronicle. 10 August 1995.
- Cragg, Roger (1 January 1997). Wales and West Central England. Thomas Telford. ISBN 978-0-7277-2576-9.
- Daniel, John (2013). "The Barry Scrapyard story, part 1". The Great Western Archive.
- de Salis, Henry Rodolph (2012). Bradshaw's Canals and Navigable Rivers of England and Wales. BoD – Books on Demand. ISBN 978-3-95427-214-3.
- "Discussion of the Barry Dock Works". Minutes of Proceedings of the Institution of Civil Engineers. The Institution. 1890.
- Ehland, Christoph (2007). Thinking Northern: Textures of Identity in the North of England. Rodopi. ISBN 978-90-420-2281-2.
- "Evidence from Associated British Ports" (PDF). February 2012.
- Gay, Hannah (1 January 2007). The History of Imperial College London, 1907–2007: Higher Education and Research in Science, Technology, and Medicine. Imperial College Press. ISBN 978-1-86094-818-3.
- Goodhead, Tim; Johnson, David (8 October 2013). Coastal Recreation Management: The sustainable development of maritime leisure. Taylor & Francis. ISBN 978-1-136-74192-0.
- Hicks, Raymond (1 January 2007). An Odyssey: From Ebbw Vale to Tyneside. Author's Web Site. ISBN 978-0-9555338-0-8.
- "History of the Business". Woodham Brothers. Archived from the original on 27 July 2009.
- Holland, Julian (27 September 2013). Dr Beeching's Axe 50 Years On: Memories of Britain's Lost Railways. F+W Media. ISBN 978-1-4463-5830-6.
- Ings, David (17 October 2013). Penarth Through Time. Amberley Publishing Limited. ISBN 978-1-4456-3022-9.
- Institute of Water Engineers (1901). Transactions.
- Jones, Robin (31 January 2014). Great Western Railway Pannier Tanks. Crowood. ISBN 978-1-84797-654-3.
- Leunig, Timothy (16 February 2012). "Post-Second World War British Railways: The Unintended Consequences of Insufficient Government Intervention". Paradoxes of Modernization: Unintended Consequences of Public Policy Reform. Oxford University Press. ISBN 978-0-19-963961-8.
- Minchinton, W.E (5 November 2013). Industrial South Wales 1750-1914: Essays in Welsh Economic History. Taylor & Francis. ISBN 978-1-136-61783-6.
- Moore, Donald (1985). Barry: The Centenary Book. Barry Centenary Book Committee. ISBN 978-0-9509738-1-4.
- Morse, Bryan (21 November 2007). A Moment in History: The Story of the American Army in the Rhondda In 1944. Y Lolfa. ISBN 978-1-84771-019-2.
- Newman, John (1995). Glamorgan: (Mid Glamorgan, South Glamorgan and West Glamorgan). Penguin Books; University of Wales Press. ISBN 978-0-14-071056-4.
- NIMA (1 January 2004). Pub142, 2004 Sailing Directions (Enroute): Ireland and the West Coast of England. ProStar Publications. ISBN 978-1-57785-556-9.
- Robinson, John (1890). "The Barry Dock Works, including the Hydraulic Machinery and the Mode of Tipping Coal". Minutes of Proceedings of the Institution of Civil Engineers. The Institution.
- "Second World War". Barry at War. Archived from the original on 5 September 2014.
- Smale, Will (28 August 2002). "Commercial Property: Westbury to Develop David's Wharf; REGENERATION: Planning Approval for More Waterfront Apartments at Barry Dock Area". Western Mail. Archived from the original on 21 September 2014.
- Starkey, David John; Jamieson, Alan G. (1 January 1998). Exploiting the Sea: Aspects of Britain's Maritime Economy Since 1870. University of Exeter Press. ISBN 978-0-85989-533-0.
- "The Barry Hospital". The British Medical Journal. 2 (2546). The BMJ. 16 October 1909. JSTOR 25283967.
- "The viaduct and World War II". Vale of Glamorgan Council. Archived from the original on 7 September 2014.
- "The Manchester Ship Canal". The Railway News. 25 November 1893.
- Transactions of the Federated Institution of Mining Engineers. Andrew Reid. 1897.
- US Hydrographic Office (1924). British Islands Pilot: The west coast of England and Wales. Hydrographic office under the authority of the secretary of the navy.
- Watson, Richard (2014). "The Birth of Barry – When Coal was King". BBC Legacies..
- Wolfe-Barry, John (1889). "The Barry Docks". Report of the annual meeting of the British Association for the Advancement of Science. J. Murray.
