= Thomas Forster Brown =

- Born: 1835; Garrigill, Cumberland, England
- Died: 23 October 1907 (aged 71–72); Richmond, North Yorkshire, England
- Occupations: Civil and mining engineer
- Known for: South Wales industry

Thomas Forster Brown (1835 – 23 October 1907) was an English civil and mining engineer who was known for his activity in South Wales.

== Career ==
Thomas Forster Brown was born in Garrigill, Cumberland in 1835. He learned his trade from Thomas Emerson Forster, who gave him practical experience of the metal and coal mines of Northumberland and Durham. In 1855 he was appointed Assistant Manager or Resident Viewer of the Stella Colliery, Durham. Three years later he became Manager of the Machen Collieries, Monmouthshire, holding this position until 1865. He advised on the opening of the Rhos Llantwit Colliery, and was engineer of this colliery until the pit was exhausted and abandoned around 1890.

Brown was deputy gaveller (mineral agent) for the Crown in the Forest of Dean from 1865 to 1903. He was one of the joint engineers in the development of the Barry Dock and Railways in 1884–89. The lead engineer was John Wolfe Barry. Henry Marc Brunel, son of the famous engineer Isambard Kingdom Brunel, was the other assistant engineer. Brown became a partner of the firm of Forster Brown and Rees in 1888. He was also an engineer for the Vale of Glamorgan Railway.

Brown was a president of the South Wales Institute of Engineers. In 1896 he was elected a member of the Royal Society for the Encouragement of Arts, Manufactures and Commerce. He died on 23 October 1907 in Richmond, North Yorkshire at the age of 72.

== Sources ==
- "Obituary. Thomas Forster Brown". Journal of the Society of Arts. 55 (2867). 1 November 1907. JSTOR 41335996.
- "Thomas Forster Brown". Minutes of the Proceedings of the Institution of Civil Engineers. 172 (1908): 313–314. 1 January 1908. doi:10.1680/imotp.1908.17386.
- Wolfe-Barry, John (1889). "The Barry Docks". Report of the annual meeting of the British Association for the Advancement of Science. J. Murray.
