= Porthkerry =

Hamlet in the Vale of Glamorgan, Wales

Coordinates: 51.392°N 3.3219°W

Porthkerry: Welsh: Porthceri
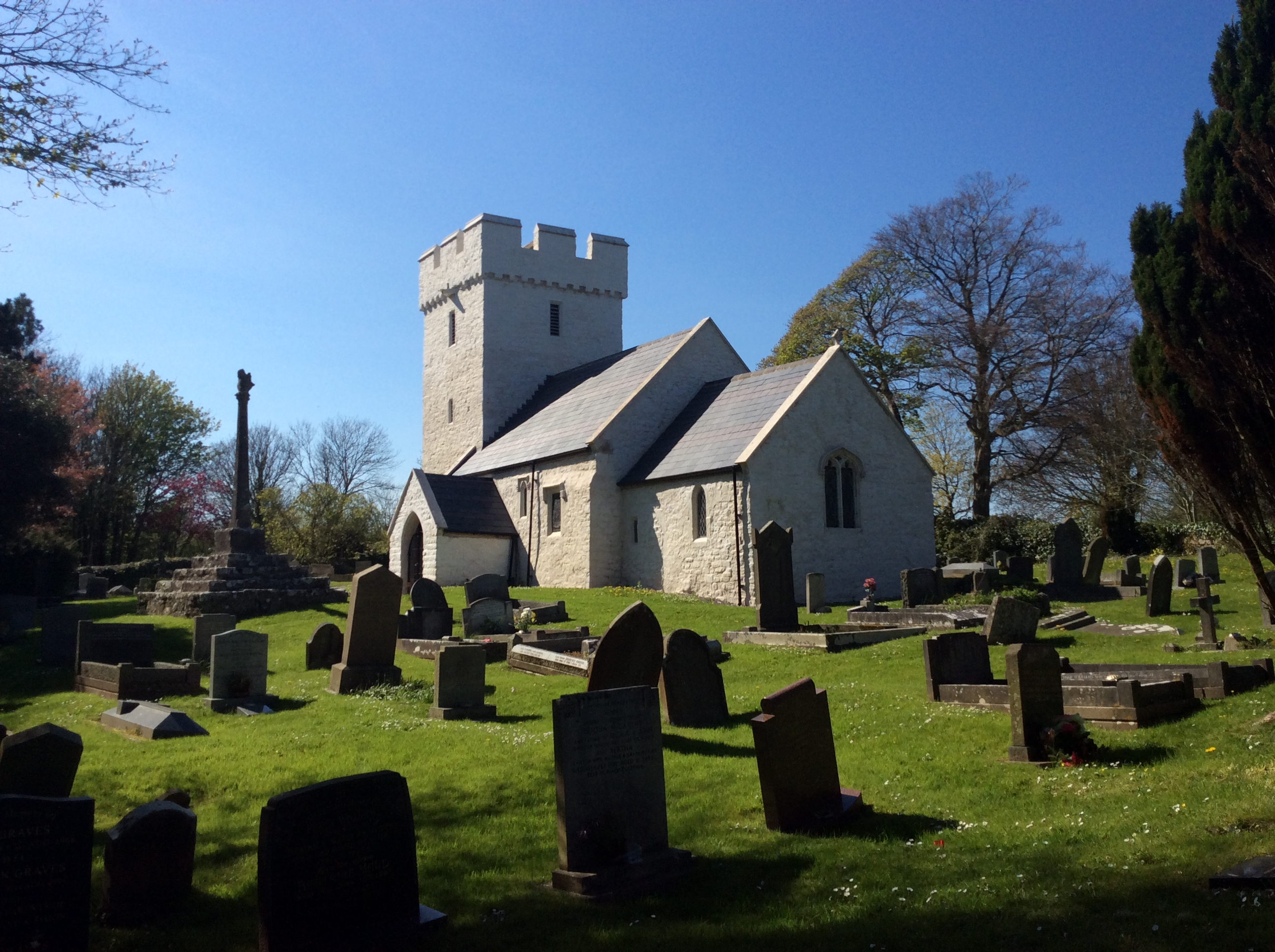
- Church of St Curig

- Location within the Vale of Glamorgan
- OS grid reference: ST081667
- Principal area: Vale of Glamorgan
- Preserved county: South Glamorgan
- Country: Wales
- Sovereign state: United Kingdom
- Post town: Barry
- Postcode district: CF62
- Police: South Wales
- Fire: South Wales
- Ambulance: Welsh
- UK Parliament: Vale of Glamorgan
- Senedd Cymru – Welsh Parliament: Vale of Glamorgan

Porthkerry (Welsh: Porthceri) is a hamlet in the Vale of Glamorgan, Wales. It lies on the Bristol Channel coast of South Wales within the community of Rhoose between that village and the town of Barry to the east. It is very close to the end of the runway of Cardiff International Airport. To the east of the hamlet is Porthkerry Country Park which occupies the valley leading down to the coast.

== History ==
One of the oldest settlements in Porthkerry is the Iron Age promontory fort known as The Bulwarks, a 4.1 hectares (10 acres) site much of which is now wooded. The Bulwarks, which consisted of three closely spaced overgrown banks fronted by ditches with the final side facing the cliffs to the south, were occupied well into the period of Roman occupation.

A little to the north of the fort site is a church dedicated to Saint Curig. Described by Newman as "a very small church", St Curig's has a single lancet window that is thought to be 13th century, but with other features, such as the east and west windows being confirmed as from the 15th century. The church door also has some very unusual, rough carvings. There are ensignia of the 'Marian Cult'. This movement wanted to push back against the downgrading of importance of the Virgin Mary in Anglican worship, but as such ideas were seen as heretical they went underground and founded secret groups and observed their own form of worship. The door carving is dated 1790 which are also evident on grave markings within the church. This would suggest that the cult was rife in Porthkerry and other parts of the Vale of Glamorgan, including near by Penmark which has similar engravings on pews and benches.

On 28 November 1831 the vessel The Nepture, sailing from Newport to Wexford in Ireland, struck a rock and sank off the coast of Porthkerry. On 10 January 1898 the Porthkerry Viaduct on the Vale of Glamorgan Line operated then by the Barry Railway Company was the scene of a non-fatal railway accident involving the collapse of the structure. The viaduct also featured in scenes in the Doctor Who television series in 2000. The Porthkerry Leisure Park hit the national headlines in November 2011 when a portion of the cliff collapsed at the edge of the site leaving some caravans hanging over the edge of the cliff.

== Porthkerry Country Park ==
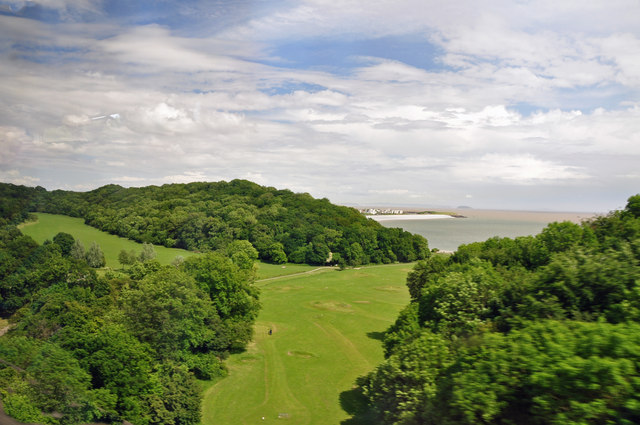
View of the park from the viaduct

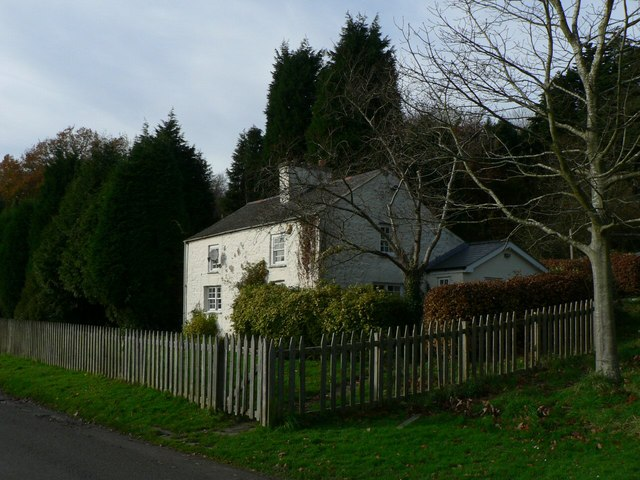
Ranger's Cottage

Porthkerry Country Park is a large, public country park between the hamlet of Porthkerry and Barry town, in a valley accessible by car from the north-eastern end at the Garden Suburb area of Barry and via a road section locally known as Fishponds Hill. The western end used to be accessible to light vehicles from Rectory Hill, north-west of Porthkerry viaduct, via an unmetalled lane from the Rectory House at valley bottom (later Egerton Grey Country Guest house, opened in 1988 but closed in 2010) but later metalled as a cycle/pedestrian way to join the metalled road near Porthkerry railway viaduct and public car park. At the south-west end, a steep cliff pathway from the former Bulwarks site, east of Porthkerry Leisure Park area, leads down to Porthkerry beach skirting the Bristol Channel. Other pathways exist, one from Porthkerry Church area adjacent to Porthkerry railway viaduct and the other at the north side of the beach via the famous "Golden Stairs" from the clifftop pathway from the Garden Suburb. Fields, extensive woodland, nature trails and a pebble-stone beach are included. A small golf course has recently been converted to a ponded area with boardwalk alternative access from the car park/café area near the viaduct (April 2020), and is visited by around 250,000 people a year.

The land was acquired by the Romilly family in 1812 to build a country house, and cottages, stables and a sawmill for local workers. Cliff Wood Mill was in use for a period but it believed to have been destroyed during the Glyndwr revolt in the early 15th century. The remains of it are a Scheduled Ancient Monument. Cliff Wood Cottage was originally built in 1583 by Owen Williams and fully rebuilt in the early 1790s. It was once the residence of a woman believed to be a witch, Ann Jenkins. The park was fully landscaped by the Romilly family in the 1840s, and they sold it to Barry Urban District Council in 1929. The park was occupied by British and American forces during World War II in the approach to D-Day, and earthworks and defences were built along the coast.

The park is particularly noted for the Porthkerry Viaduct, crossed by a railway originally used to transport coal from some of the South Wales Valleys north of Bridgend to Barry Docks port in the late 19th and early 20th centuries. Built in the late 1890s, the viaduct has 19 arches, which vary between 45 and 50 feet (15 metres) in width, and rises to a height of 110 feet (34 metres). It became Grade II listed in 1963. The former Egerton Grey Country House Hotel stands near the viaduct. The house was originally built in the 17th century and functioned as a rectory for some time.

On the northern side of Porthkerry Park there was a small hamlet named Cwmciddy (meaning Valley of the Black Dog in Welsh). It first appeared in the mid 13th century and by 1622 had five houses and several farm buildings, but by 1812, only three cottages and a farmhouse remained. The cottages were demolished in the 1840s by the Romilly family when Porthkerry Park was landscaped. The name - although slightly anglicised - lives on in the area, in the form of a nearby public house, The Cwm Ciddy, but its name was changed to the Toby Carvery by 2010 and adjoins a Travelodge hotel. An area of the park known as Cwm Barry, along the main approach road, was used for farming and contains woodland of about 1.3 hectares with hawthorn, blackthorn, hazel, ash and sycamore trees alongside Barry Brook. The brook flows into a pond at Fishponds Hill bottom, near the only vehicular access road. Cwm Barry Cottage was built in around 1845 to house the park ranger but was demolished in 1972; all that remained was a low boundary wall and fruit trees in the woodland which were once part of the cottage garden but no evidence of this now exists. A mill race used to tee in with Barry Brook just north of that cottage and fed the former wood mill in Mill Wood. The mill was driven by an overshot mill wheel which was also fed from a millpond and dam and race placed upstream in the Nant Talwg brook. On an unknown date after the mill became redundant, the dam was dynamited, the bulk of which can be seen from the Mill Wood bridleway, as a concrete mass lying on its side. The country park is now managed by the Vale of Glamorgan Council, and a Ranger's office and maintenance vehicle site is located at Nightingale Cottage halfway into the park.

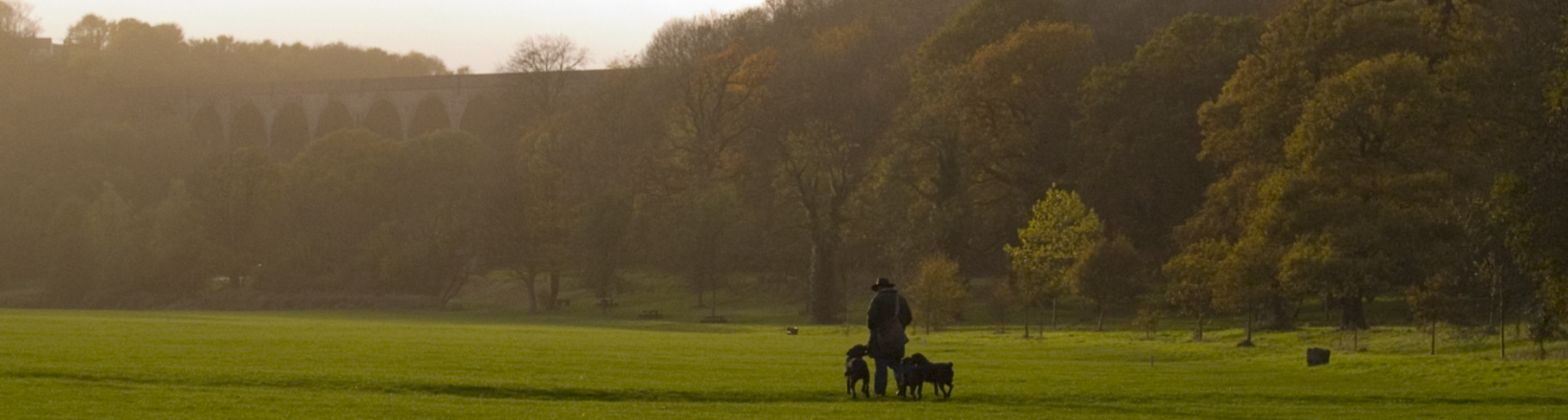
Porthkerry Park with view of the Porthkerry Viaduct

== Notable people ==
- Edward Romilly, cricketer, MP and High Sheriff of Glamorganshire
