= Robert Jenner =

Robert Jenner may refer to:

- Robert Jenner (ice hockey), English ice hockey player
- Robert Jenner (MP) (1584–1651), English merchant and politician
- Robert Francis Jenner (1802–1860), High Sheriff of Glamorgan
