= Cadoxton River =

Cadoxton River Cadoxton Brook
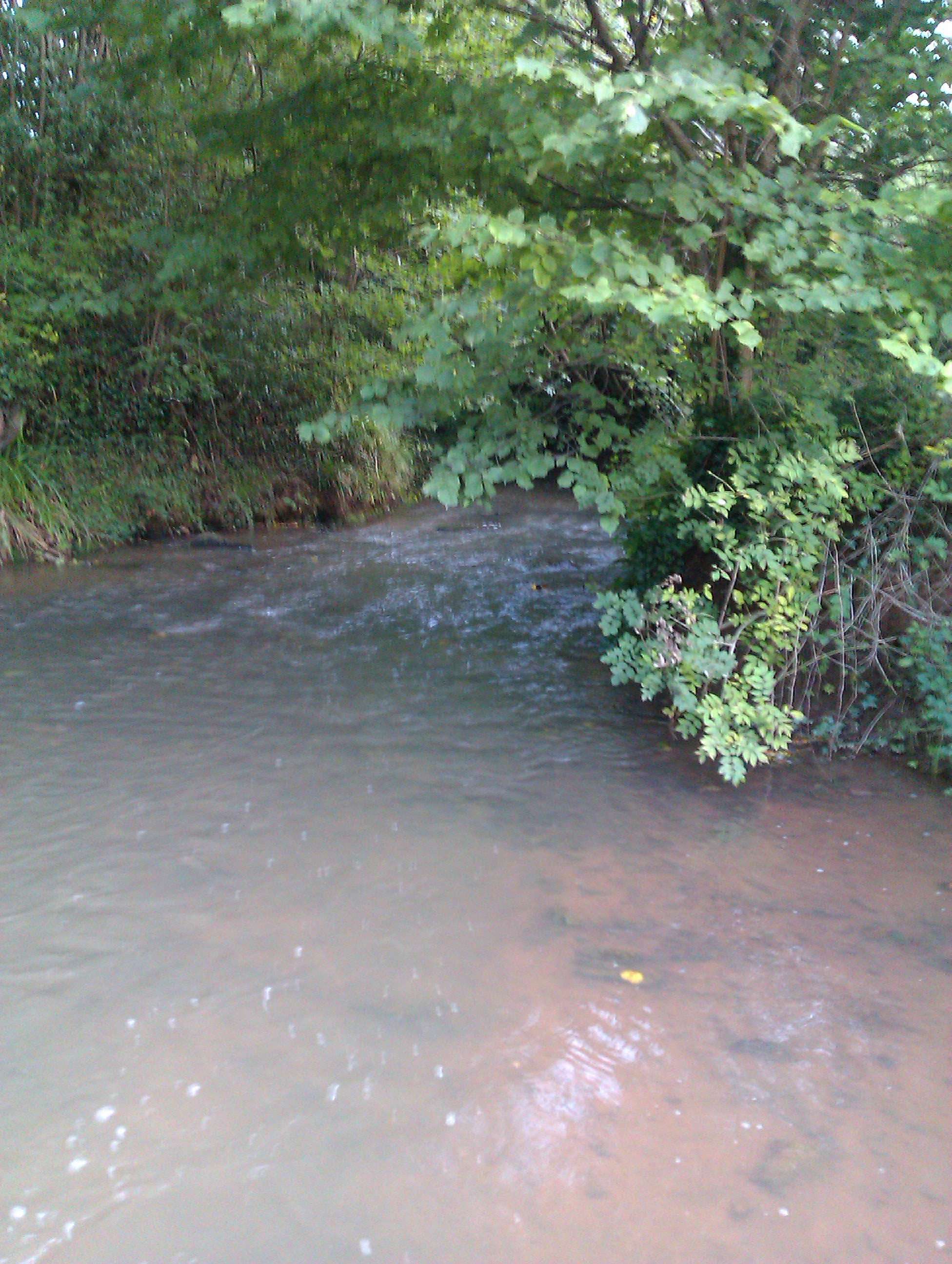
- The river in the area known as the Millfields, near Dinas Powys
- Native name: Afon Tregatwg (Welsh)

Location
- Country: Wales, United Kingdom
- Region: South Wales
- County: Vale of Glamorgan
- Cities: Michaelston-le-Pit, Dinas Powis, Barry, The Bendricks, Vale of Glamorgan

Physical characteristics
- Source
  - location: Michaelston-le-Pit, Vale of Glamorgan, Wales
  - coordinates: 51.4460°N 3.2192°W
- Mouth: Bristol Channel
  - coordinates: 51.3954°N 3.2495°W
- Length: 8.0 km (5.0 mi)
- Discharge
  - location: The Bendricks, Vale of Glamorgan

The Cadoxton River (Welsh: Afon Tregatwg) is a short river in the Vale of Glamorgan, South Wales and with a length of about 5 miles/8 kilometres it is one of Wales's shortest rivers.

== Course ==
The water course becomes known as the Cadoxton just north of Dinas Powys village near the hamlet of Michaelston-le-Pit, at the confluence of the Wrinstone Brook and the Bullcroft Brook. From there, it flows in a generally south-westerly direction through Dinas Powys, along the route of the A4055, or Cardiff Road, towards the town of Barry. Once at Barry, it flows through an artificial channel towards its manmade estuary at The Bendricks, Vale of Glamorgan.

== History ==
Although the river is but a stream today, it appeared to have had a greater flow in times gone by - large enough to appear on some maps of Britain. Some small vessels could almost reach Dinas Powys, but, like the River Thaw a few miles west, it is likely to have silted up, and the mouth became a mud channel before being redeveloped. The lower reaches of the river have been extensively modified in the past. In 1884, the Barry Railway Company began construction work on the Barry docks, which were cut into the natural estuary of the river, which was diverted away. The lower river should be tidal, but a sluice gate built at the same time as the docks keeps the water fresh.

From the 1940s through to the 1970s, the bottom stretches of the Cadoxton were polluted by effluents from the many chemical plants nearby. However, due to environmental regulation the water quality is now improving and the river supports fish, including trout.

On 19 April 2005, most of the river's trout were killed when dangerous pollutants leaked from a vehicle travelling to the Barry chemical plants, seeping into Bullcroft Brook and thus damaging the ecosystem. 183 dead fish were found in a 5 km stretch of the river and the company, Calor Gas Transport, a division of Calor Gas Ltd, was fined £20,000.

== Etymology ==
Despite its name, the river does not flow through the town of Cadoxton any more. In the past, however, it did flow through the centre of Barry. At high tide, small boats could sail up into Barry. Originally it met the sea at the eastern edge of Barry Island, where the present dock entrance is situated today. Barry Island ceased to be an island when the river was diverted away and the docks constructed.

== Tributaries ==
Along its short course, a few smaller streams join the river.

=== Bullcroft Brook ===
Bullcroft Brook rises near Caerau, south of the A4232 road. It is just under 2 miles long, and flows southward to join the Wrinstone Brook at Michaelston-le-Pit. On 19 April 2005 the stream was polluted when a vehicle carrying styrene monomer lost 620 litres of the chemical, which heavy rains carried to Bullcroft Brook. The trout in the river system suffered as a result.

=== Wrinstone Brook ===
Wrinstone Brook is the larger of the two main tributaries of the river, flowing eastwards for 3 miles. It rises from multiple sources around Wenvoe and flows near the tiny cluster of houses at Wrinstone. It flows through a wooded ravine for much of its course, and just upstream from the confluence with Bullcroft Brook, several weirs dam the river, creating many ponds. These are known locally as the Seven Lakes, or alternatively the Salmon Leaps.

=== East Brook ===
The East Brook is a smaller tributary of the river. It starts at Llandough, flowing for 2 miles before joining the Cadoxton south of the A4055 at Dinas Powys. It flows through the area of Dinas known as the Murch, and also the area called Eastbrook, to which it gave its name.

=== Coldbrook ===
The Coldbrook rises in the Merthyr Dyfan area of Barry, and is 4 miles long. It has a few small tributaries, the largest of which is called the Nant yr Argae, which in turn starts at St Andrews Major and has a length of 2 miles. The Coldbrook meets the Cadoxton east of Palmerstown, Barry, in some fields in the locality known as Biglis. Another, much smaller stream with a length of about 1 kilometre also drains this area, and converges with the Colbrook just upstream from where it joins the Cadoxton.

=== Sully Brook ===
Sully Brook is one of the largest tributaries of the river. Its source is just west of Penarth. It flows southward through the Cosmeston Lakes Country Park. Here it meets a much smaller, unnamed stream, and turns westward. It finally joins with the Cadoxton near Barry docks. Like the Cadoxton, it was also diverted slightly to cool the new chemical plants.

== Flooding ==
According to the Environment Agency, in the October floods of 1998 only six properties at Dinas Powys were affected. Flooding was caused by the floodwater overtopping the banks of the Cadoxton River among others and ordinary watercourses, restrictions to flow in channels and surcharging of drains.
