= Wrinstone =

Hamlet in the Vale of Glamorgan, Wales

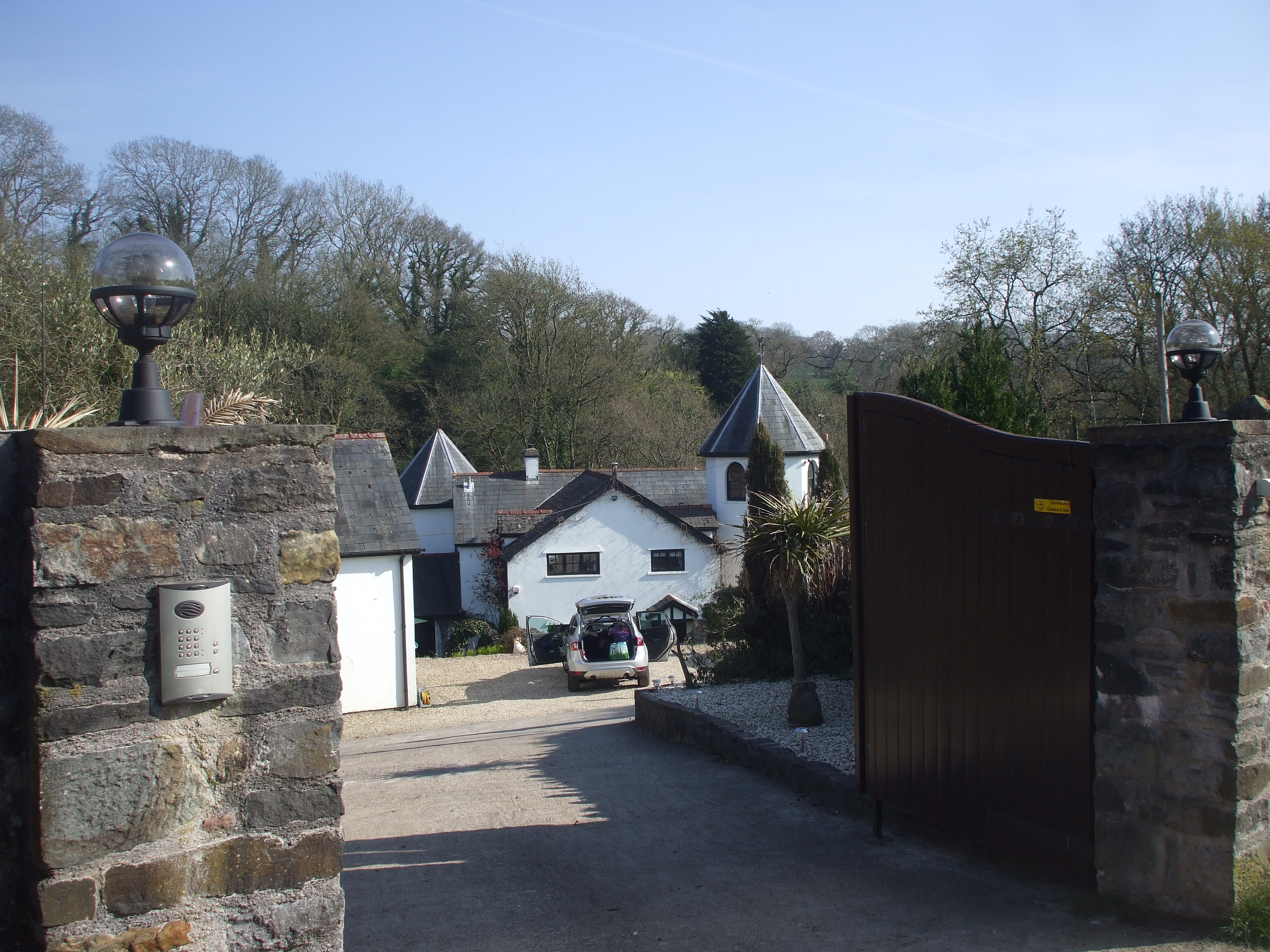
- Wrinstone House

- Location within Vale of Glamorgan

General information
- Location: Wrinstone, near Wenvoe, Vale of Glamorgan, Wales
- Coordinates: 51°26′46″N 3°14′39″W
- Completed: 1880

Wrinstone or Wrinston (Welsh: Wrinstwn) is a medieval hamlet, just east of Wenvoe, Vale of Glamorgan, south Wales. The Wrinstone estate was variously also known as Wrenston, Wrencheston or Wrenchester. The Barry Railway line ran past the hamlet and entered the Wenvoe Tunnel just to the north near Wenvoe Quarry. It closed after a fire in 1963.

== History ==
A manor was held here from the early Norman period, and at various points the lords of Wrinstone Manor were in control of the nearby Cwrt-yr-Ala estate and property. Walter of Gloucester was known to have held Wrinstone in the mid 13th century, but by 1262 it was held by Walter de Reigny, who also held the nearby manor of Michaelston-le-Pit. It was then ceded to his son Milo de Reigny. Milo's daughter, Ela (or Joan) (b. 1235), became the heiress of Wrenchester (Wrinstone)) Castle, Michaelston-le-Pit, Llantwit, and Llancarvan. Through her marriage to Simon de Raleigh, of Nettlecombe, Somerset, the Wrinstone manor passed to the de Raleighs, their descendants holding the manor for six generations. Their son, also named Simon, became High Sheriff of Glamorgan in 1299, until 1304. Thomas Whellesborough, heir of a Simon de Raleigh, was lord of the manor until his death in 1482.

Around 1480, there were eight free tenements. Of the twelve customary tenements, one was a freeholding owned by a William Yeston of Le Grave (later Greave Farm) which was 30 acres (12 ha) in size. The other customary tenements ranged in size between 15–33 acres (6.1–13.4 ha); there were also three cottagers. The manor eventually fell to the Trevelyans who sold their Welsh estates off in 1650 to pay off debts for supporting Charles I. The manor briefly fell into possession of Colonel Thomas Horton's Brigade for victory at the Battle of St Fagans in 1648, who then sold it to Colonel Philip Jones of the Fonmon Estate. From this date until the end of the 18th century it was under the Jones's of Fonmon and the Thomases of Wenvoe. It became a township of Wenvoe after the medieval period.

In 1685 the hamlet had 20 tenements. Estate plans dated to the 1760s reveal 9 houses; 5 farms and 4 cottages, grouped around a green. By 1839 it had been reduced to 5 houses.

== Geography ==
Arable lands are located by Wrinstone Brook, which, along with its tributaries, drains into Cog Moors, Dinas Powys, Pablin, and the Barry Docks. Wrinstone and Michaelston-le-Pit were contiguous manors. The remains of a trail, roughly 4 metres wide on average, leads from the hamlet to the Church Field. To the southeast is St. Andrews Major and Dinas Powys. To the northeast is a quarry and Caerau, a western suburb of Cardiff.

== Notable landmarks ==
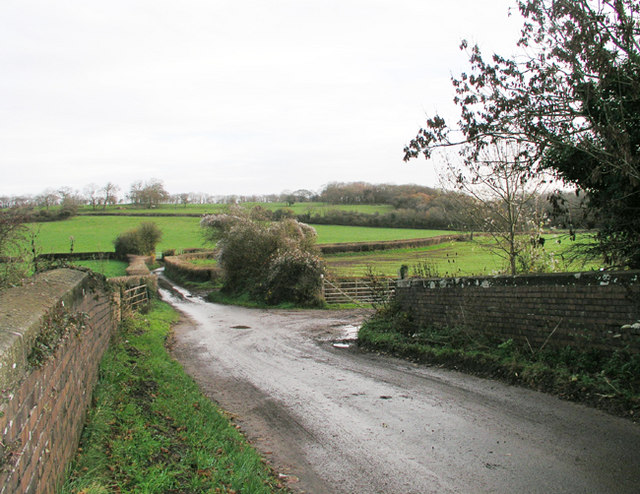
Farm land at Wrinstone

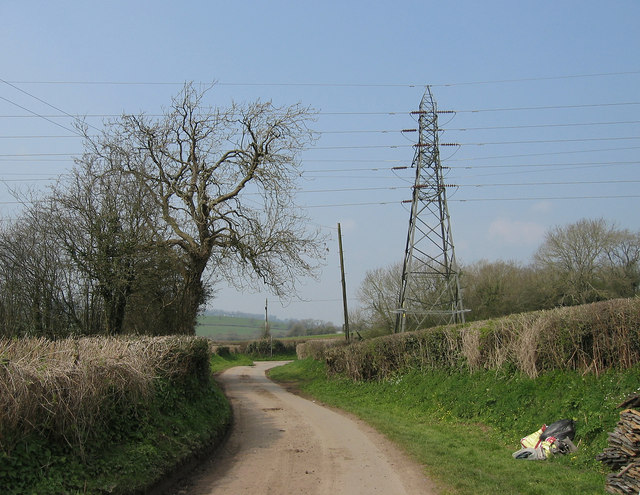
Local countryside

Wrinstone House is a country house, built in 1880 on the site of the old gamekeepers cottage. It is a well-appointed stylish white house, perhaps influenced by William Burges, with two distinct turreted wings added in the 1980s, containing six additional rooms. The house contains 18 rooms in all, with 7 bedrooms and 5 bathrooms and has an outdoor swimming pool and tennis court, rare in Glamorgan.

No traces of Wrinston/Wrencheston castle exist except for disturbed ground in the area of Wrinston's farm buildings. It was known to have been established in the Middle Ages, but was destroyed in the early 18th century. Leland documents that a while ago it was in ruin but for one high tower. The hamlet also had a church, believed to have been located to the northwest of the present farm here, named "Church Field". Several fragments of medieval walls have been unearthed in the vicinity, and the fragments of a side wall of a medieval building have been found built into a 6.1m by 2.1 m wall, made of limestone rubble with hard sandy mortar.
