= Goldsland =

Hamlet and farm in south Wales

Goldsland: Welsh: Tregold
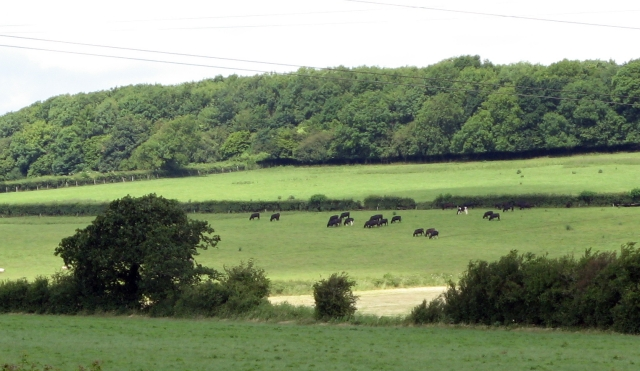
- Cattle in a field, looking across to Goldsland Wood

- Location within the Vale of Glamorgan
- Principal area: Vale of Glamorgan
- Preserved county: South Glamorgan
- Country: Wales
- Sovereign state: United Kingdom
- Postcode district: CF
- Police: South Wales
- Fire: South Wales
- Ambulance: Welsh
- UK Parliament: Vale of Glamorgan
- Senedd Cymru – Welsh Parliament: Vale of Glamorgan

Goldsland (Welsh: Tregold) is a small hamlet and farm in the Vale of Glamorgan in south Wales. It is located near the boundary of the Wenvoe Castle Golf Club in the parish of Wenvoe. It lies to the east of Dyffryn and south of St Lythans and the road leading from the west passes through the farms of Old and New Wallace. Goldsland Brook flows through here. A sub-manor was reportedly held at Goldsland by a Mathew of Llandaff under the manor of Wenvoe in 1583.

== Goldsland Farm ==
The main landmark is the Goldsland Farmhouse, with a planned farmyard dated to the early-mid 19th century and a large barn with double doors. The house is built from "narrow stone rubble with dressed stone voussoirs and quoins and Welsh slate roof". The farmhouse would have supplied milk to the Jenners of nearby Wenvoe Castle.

Historically this farm appears to have reared some prized animals and gained some renown in the farming communities of Glamorgan. In 1870, E. Thomas won a prize for "Best Pair of Sows" by the Glamorganshire Agricultural Society in Cowbridge, and in 1893, the owner of Goldsland Farm, Lewis Jones, foaled a horse which won first place at Glamorganshire Show at Neath and first place at the Cardiff Horse Show in 1894, amongst others.

== Goldsland Wood and caves ==
Goldsland Wood lies to the northwest of the farmhouse, an area of deciduous woodland on a low limestone ridge which spans east–west for 2.5 kilometres. There are reserves of malachite here.

There are several caves in the area across the ridge which have been explored as part of the University of Central Lancashire sponsored Goldsland Caves Research Project since 2005. The project aims to "evaluate the chronological range of the deposits preserved in the caves; to assess the sedimentological processes involved in the formation of the deposits; to seek evidence as a basis for environmental reconstruction; and to seek evidence, in particular, of the human use of the caves in the Palaeolithic and into the Holocene and for their possible use for burial." The archaeologists have discovered human remains, Mesolithic and Neolithic flintwork and Neolithic pottery. The main cave of Goldsland is located at 51.439062°N 3.283293°W.

Dr. Rick Peterson, the leader of the archaeological project of the university said of the findings, "The style of pottery and the flint saw-blade suggested that the remains date to around 3000 BC, which means they are over 5000 years old. We also discovered a smaller pit containing the ash from a cremation pyre, but little sign of the cremated body or any evidence where the cremation took place. Other human remains have been discovered in caves roughly around this period, from the Neolithic or New Stone Age, but almost all of them were identified years after excavation. The Goldsland caves have never been excavated before. We went there hoping to find undisturbed evidence for whatever ritual took place 5000 years ago that led to peoples’ bones being put in caves and we seem to have found it."

== Gallery ==
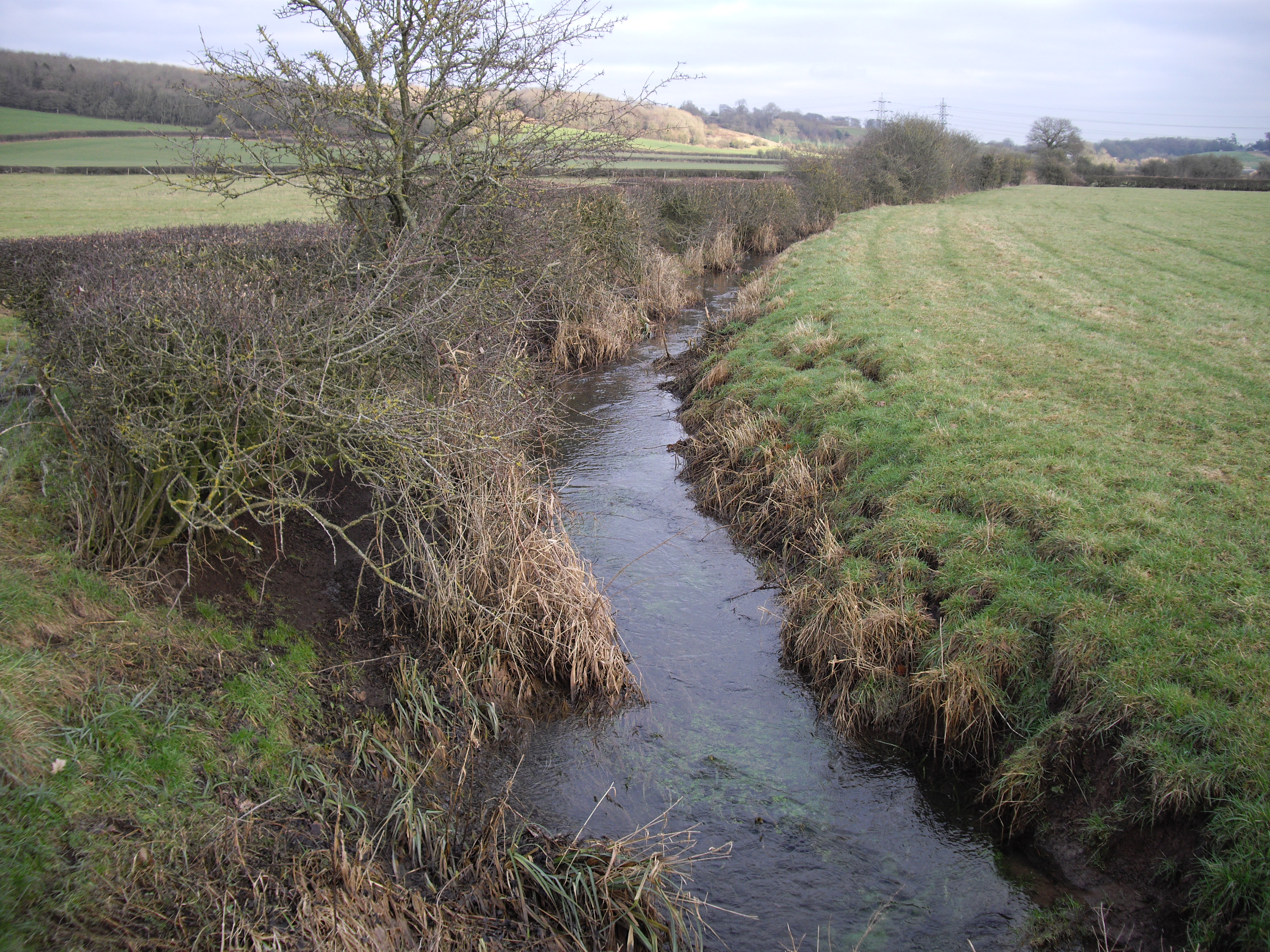
Goldsland Brook

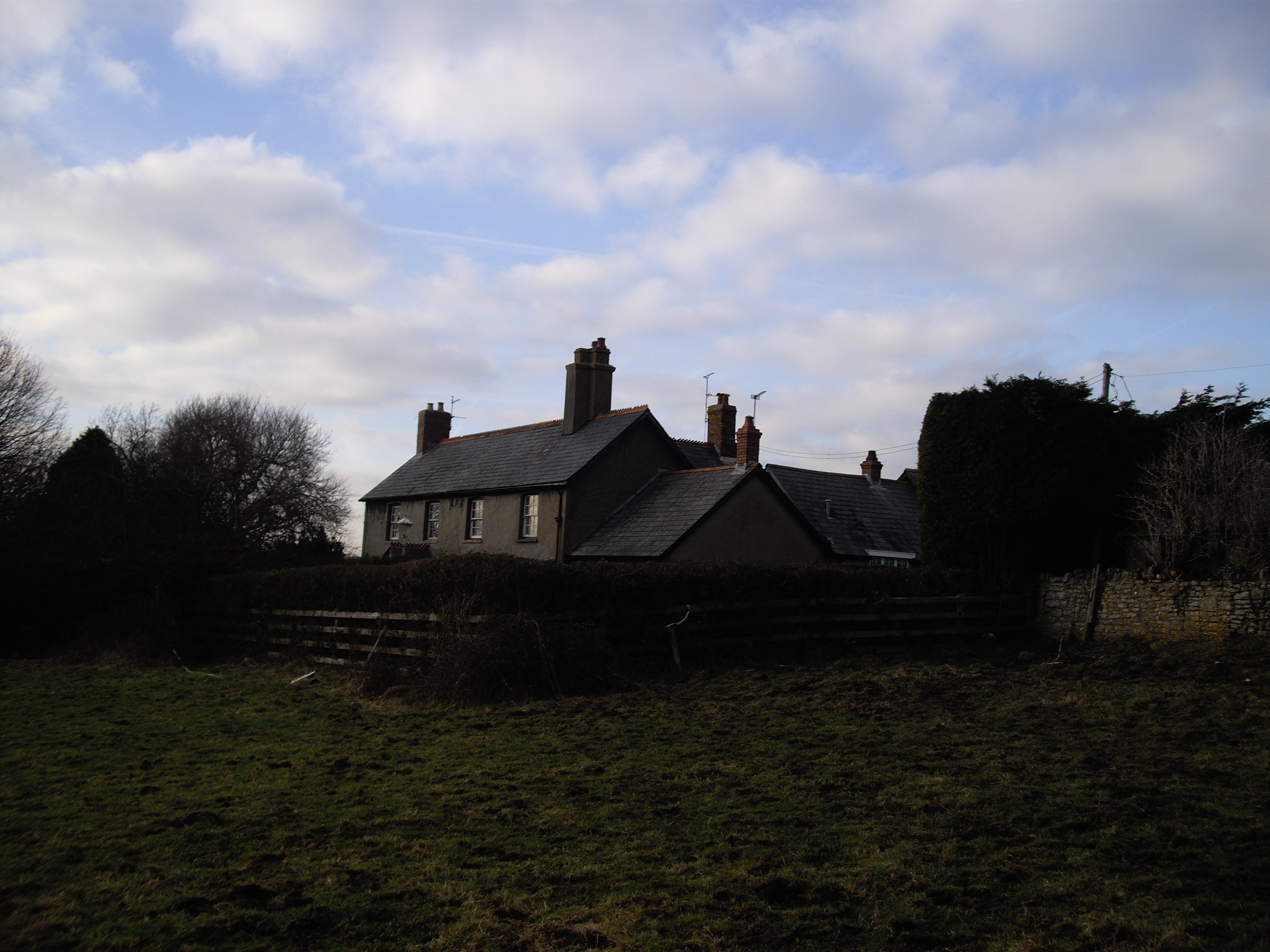
New Wallace Farm

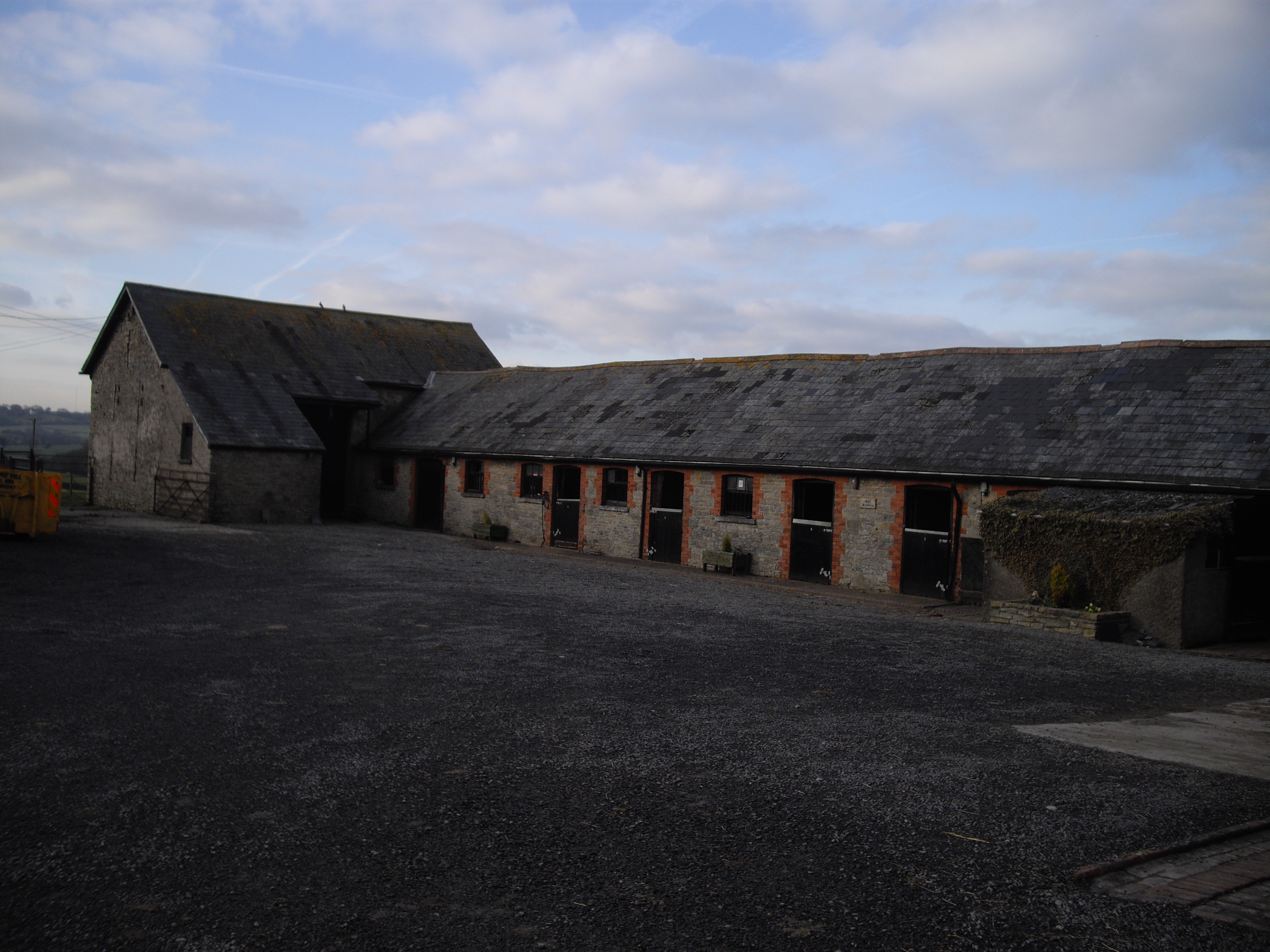
New Wallace Farm
