= Sir John Thomas, 1st Baronet =

Sir John Thomas, 1st Baronet of Wenvoe Castle, Wenvoe Glamorganshire was Sheriff of Glamorgan in 1700.

Sir John Thomas was the eldest of the three sons of William Thomas, Esq. by his wife, Sarah Powell, the heir to John Powell of Flemingston Glamorgan. He married his distant cousin Elizabeth Ludlow nee Thomas, widow of Edmund Ludlow, 35 years his senior. While he had no issue, the marriage ensured the return of the two estates of Wenvoe Castle and Ruperra Castle to the Thomas Family. William Thomas was created a Baronet on 24 December 1694 with the remainder to his two brothers, Edmund and William. On Sir John's death in 1703 Edmund inherited the Baronetcy and married Mary Howe, daughter of John Grubham Howe with whom he had 2 sons, Edmund who became the third Baronet in 1723 and John who married Sophia daughter of Arnold van Keppel, 1st Earl of Albemarle.

Baronetage of England
New creation	Baronet (of Wenvoe); 1694–1703	Succeeded by Edmond Thomas
