= Peter Birt =

British businessman

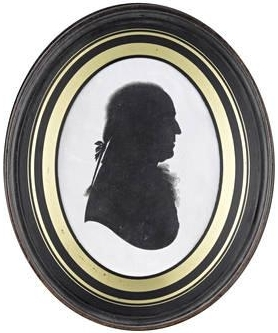
- Silhouette of Peter Birt by John Field (1763)

High Sheriff of Glamorgan
- In office 1780–1780
- Preceded by: Christopher Bassett of Lanelay, Pontyclun
- Succeeded by: Charles Bowen of Merthyr Mawr

Personal details
- Born: c. 1723
- Died: June 1791
- Occupation: Businessman
- Known for: Builder of Wenvoe Castle

Peter Birt (c. 1723 – June 1791) was a businessman from Airmyn, Yorkshire, England, who made his fortune from the Aire and Calder Navigation and used part of his wealth to build the mansion named Wenvoe Castle. He became High Sheriff of Glamorgan.

== Businessman ==
Peter Birt was born around 1723 in Yorkshire. One source says his family was well-off yeomen from Berkshire, but others said he had been "bred a tailor". He became a merchant in the trade with Russia. Birt became involved with Sir Henry Ibbetson in a coal-mining venture. In 1758 Birt and Ibbetson acquired a 14-year lease on the tolls of the Aire and Calder Navigation for £6,000. This privately managed waterway in the West Riding of Yorkshire was one of the first river navigation schemes in Britain. It provides a water route from the North Sea inland to the Pennine waterways by way of the Humber estuary and the River Ouse. The partners agreed with the request of the proprietors of the Navigation to give up trading so they could not be accused of giving their goods preferential treatment.

Birt was described as unpopular but efficient. In 1771 Birt asked John Smeaton for advice on improving the navigation to head off the threat of a proposal to build a trans-Pennine canal that would bypass the navigation. Smeaton issued a report on 28 December 1771 that recommended construction of new locks and canal cuts, large-scale dredging to ensure that even in a dry season the water was at least 1 metre (3 ft 3 in) deep, and a bypass canal cut below Haddlesey. The planned cut was extended in 1772 to almost 8 kilometres (5.0 mi) between the River Aire at Haddlesey and the Ouse at Selby. In 1772 Peter Birt became the sole lessee of the Navigation, with a 21-year lease for which he paid £8,500. This in effect gave him a monopoly of transport on the Navigation, which he exploited ruthlessly. Birt soon owned many boats on the waterway and several important collieries in the region.

The local industrialists and woollen merchants resented Birt's control, said the Navigation was poorly maintained and demanded reform. Birt agreed to give up his lease in return for a share of the Navigation Company. In May 1774 Birt was given a 10% share of the Aire and Calder Navigation estates and profits by Act of Parliament. The planned works on the Navigation were undertaken in 1775–79 and cost £40,000. The new Selby Canal was inaugurated on 29 April 1778. The Navigation Company was immensely profitable for the next fifty years or so, with Birt and his heirs receiving 10% of the income. Birt decided to move away from his residence at Airmyn Hall and find a place to spend his retirement where he was less well-known.

== Wenvoe castle ==
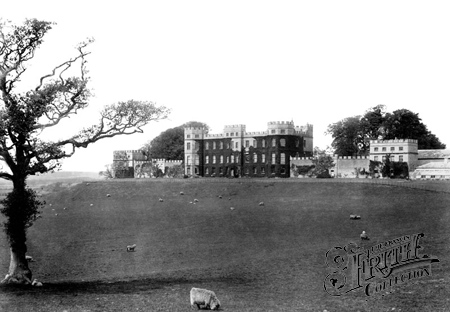
Wenvoe Castle, 1899

The owner of the estate of Wenvoe, near Cardiff, died suddenly in October 1767 leaving many debts. The estate was put up for sale in September 1769, and was bought by Birt in September 1774 for £41,000. The legalities were completed in May 1775. (Note: The castle of Winwere, otherwise Wenno, or Wenvoe is noticed by John Leland, (Itin. vol. iv. p. 40, 2nd ed.) who wrote, "All the buildings of this Wenno standing on a little hille is downe saving one Towr & broken Waules.) Birt had the old castle completely demolished, although some material was reused in the new Wenvoe Castle that replaced it. The new building was based on designs by Robert Adam dated 1776, with Birt's friend Thomas Roberts as executant architect. Most of the new building was of locally quarried "blue stone", but Bath stone was brought via the port of Cardiff, probably for the quoins and corner stones. The foundations were almost complete by 29 April 1776, and the roof was on before the end of that year.

The building was massive, with a large central rectangular block from which low wings extended from each side. The main front was three stories high and 374 feet (114 m) long including the two wings. The whole length was topped with battlements. A contemporary writer said the house and grounds, "exhibits a charming effort of bad taste and bourgeoisity."

Birt was High Sheriff of Glamorgan for 1780. He died in June 1791 and was buried at Wenvoe. He was predeceased by his wife (1787), his son Peter (1788) and his daughter Mary, wife of John Richards of Cardiff (1790).

== Legacy ==
Peter Birt had three surviving daughters at the time of his death, Ann, Jane and Judy. Ann Birt married Robert Jenner (1743–1810) of Chislehurst, Kent. Their son Robert Jenner (1776–1824) inherited Wenvoe Castle. The castle was passed in turn to his son Robert Francis Jenner (1802–1860) and grandson Robert Francis Lascelles Jenner (1826–83). The second son of Ann Birt and Robert Jenner was Herbert, who later took the name Herbert Jenner-Fust (1778–1852), and became an English judge. Herbert's son, Dr. Henry Lascelles Jenner (1820–98), was the first Bishop of Dunedin. The Bishop's son Henry Jenner (1848–1934) was an authority on the Cornish language. Jane Birt married John Price of Llandaff. Judy Birt married Sir John Nicholl of Merthyr Mawr on 8 September 1787. Their marriage took place at Wenvoe. They had one surviving son and three daughters.

The main block of Wenvoe Castle was badly damaged by fire in 1910, and later the whole building was torn down apart from a pavilion. The estate is now a golf course.

== Sources ==
- Bird, John (1987), Diary of John Bird 1987 Biographical notes, South Wales Record Society
- Burke, Sir Bernard (1868), "Dunedin, New Zealand, Bishop of", A Genealogical and Heraldic Dictionary of the Peerage and Baronetage of the British Empire, Henry Colburn
- Burke, Bernard (1894), A Genealogical and Heraldic History of the Landed Gentry of Great Britain & Ireland, Harrison, ISBN 9780394487267
- James, Brian Ll. (1978), "Contributions towards a history of Wenvoe Castle", Reports and Transactions, XCVIII 1974–76, Cardiff Naturalists' Society
- Knowles, Eleanor (2016), "Aire & Calder Navigation", Engineering Timelines
- Lewis, Samuel (1840), A Topographical Dictionary of Wales: Comprising the Several Counties, Cities, Boroughs, Corporate and Market Towns, Parishes, Chapelries, and Townships, with Historical and Statistical Descriptions, S. Lewis
- "Obituary – Mr. Henry Jenner", The Times (46750): 19; col A, 10 May 1934
- Sanders, Bob (2016), THE SHERIFFS OF GLAMORGAN 1541 - 1900
- Stanhope, Rev. Charles, ed. (September 1787), "Marriages", The New Lady's Magazine, Or, Polite and Entertaining Companion for the Fair Sex
- Thorne, R. G. (1986), "NICHOLL, Sir John (1759-1838), of Merthyr Mawr, Glam.", in R. Thorne (ed.), The History of Parliament: the House of Commons 1790-1820, Boydell and Brewer, archived from the original on 24 April 2019
- Venn, John (15 September 2011), "Jenner (post Jenner-Fust), Herbert", Alumni Cantabrigienses: A Biographical List of All Known Students, Graduates and Holders of Office at the University of Cambridge, from the Earliest Times to 1900, Cambridge University Press, ISBN 978-1-108-03613-9
- "Wenvoe Castle", Coflein, Royal Commission on the Ancient and Historical Monuments of Wales
- Williams, W. Wynn (July 1852), "Outrageous Proceedings in the Time of Henry VI", Archaeologia Cambrensis, New Series (XI)
- Wilson, Richard George (1971), Gentlemen Merchants: The Merchant Community in Leeds, 1700–1830, Manchester University Press, ISBN 978-0-7190-0459-9
