= Michaelston =

Michaelston may refer to:

- Michaelston-y-Fedw, small rural village and community to the west of the city of Newport, Wales, on the border of Cardiff city and Caerphilly county borough
- Michaelston-le-Pit, village to the west of the city of Cardiff, Wales
- Michaelston-super-Ely, village, to the west of the city of Cardiff, Wales
