= John Nicholl (judge) =

Welsh Member of Parliament and judge

The Right Honourable Sir John Nicholl
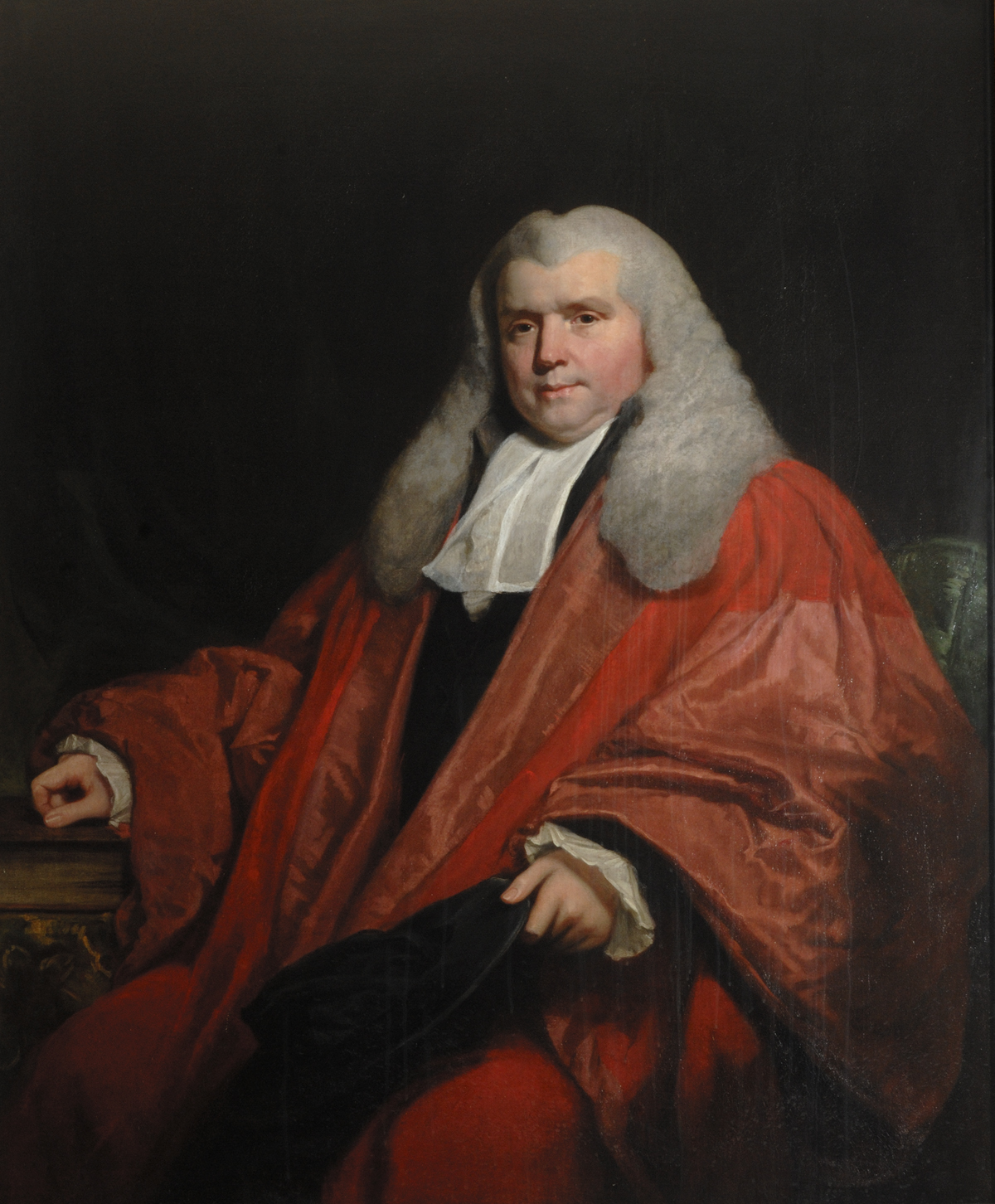

Member of Parliament for Penryn
- In office 1802–1806

Member of Parliament for Hastings
- In office 1806–1807

Member of Parliament for Great Bedwyn
- In office 1807–1832

Personal details
- Born: John Nicholl; 16 March 1759 Llan-maes, Wales
- Died: 26 August 1838 (aged 79) Merthyr Mawr, Wales
- Party: British Tory party
- Education: St John's College, Oxford

Sir John Nicholl (16 March 1759 – 26 August 1838) was a Welsh Member of Parliament and judge. As a judge he was noted "for inflexible impartiality and great strength and soundness of judgement".

== Early history ==
Nicholl was born in 1759, the second son of John Nicholl of Llan-maes, a small village near Llantwit Major in Wales. He was educated at Cowbridge and Bristol Grammar Schools, before gaining entry to St John's College, Oxford, in 1775. He graduated as Bachelor of Civil Law in 1780 and as Doctor of Civil Law in 1785. He was called to the bar of the Doctors' Commons in 1785.

== Professional career ==
Nicholl built an extensive practice and on 6 November 1798 he succeeded Sir William Scott as King's Advocate and was knighted as was custom for the position. Within this role, Nicholl would often brief the Privy Council and Secretary of State on international law.

In 1802, Nicholl was elected to Parliament holding the seat of Penryn in Cornwall. After a brief period as Member of Parliament of Hastings from 1806 to 1807, he was elected to the seat of Great Bedwyn, and remained the member of the constituency until the Reform Act 1832, upon which time he retired. Nicholl was a staunch Tory throughout his political career and steadily opposed parliamentary reform and Roman Catholic emancipation.

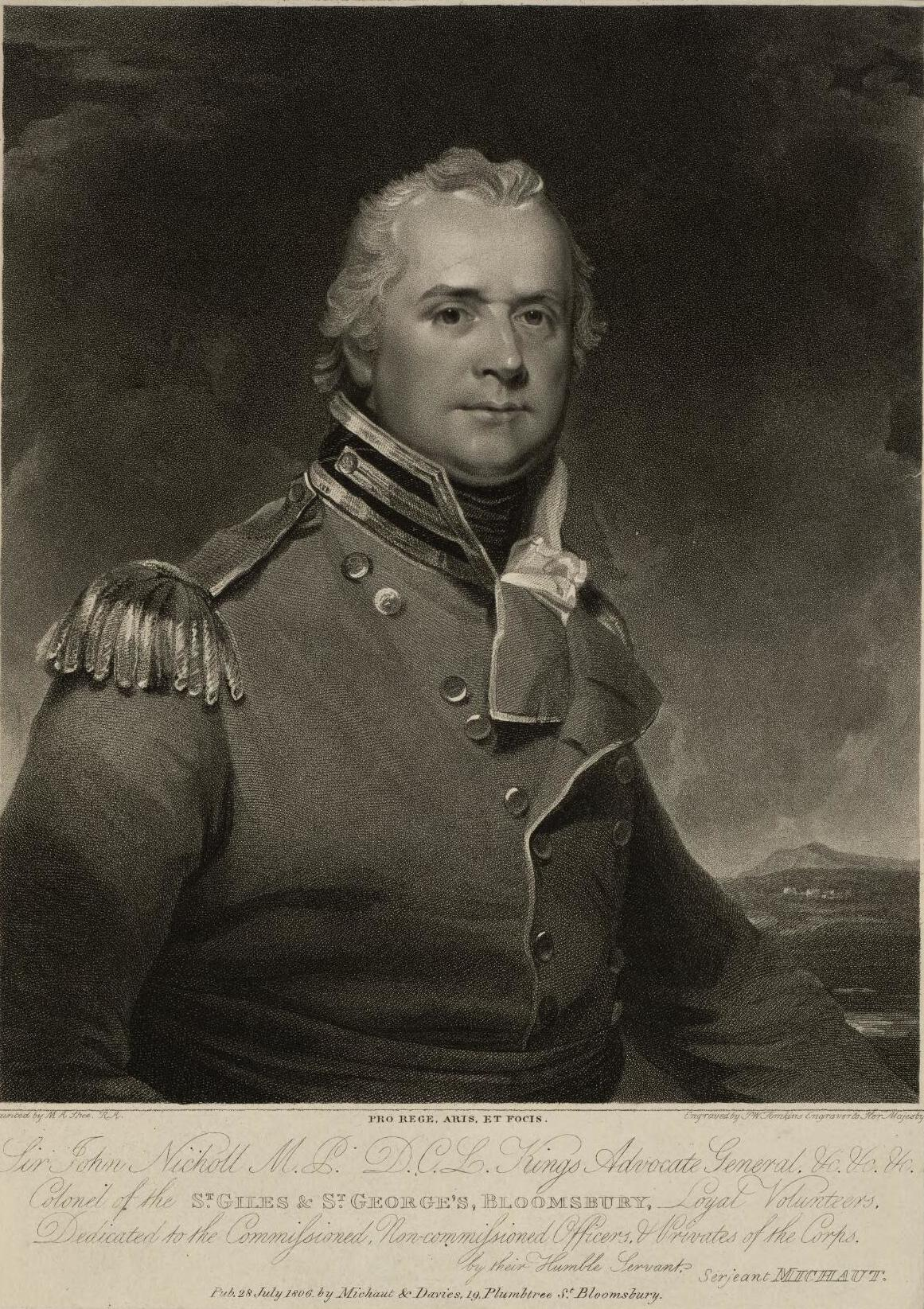
Sir John Nicholl M.P. D.C.L. Kings Advocate General, in 1806

In 1809 he was appointed Dean of the Arches, was admitted to the Privy Council and became a judge of the Prerogative Court of Canterbury. In this capacity, he decided the much quoted case of White v Driver. In 1833 Nicholl was appointed as Judge of the High Court of Admiralty and held the post until his death in 1838; though he resigned his offices as Dean of Arches and in the Prerogative Court after he was made vicar-general to the Archbishop of Canterbury's court in 1834. For his work during the Napoleonic Wars, as a member of the volunteer movement, he was awarded the rank of lieutenant-colonel.

Nicholl was a Fellow of the Royal Society and of the Society of Antiquaries. A monument to John Nicholl son of Sir John Nicholl is to be seen in the Dyfrig chapel of Llandaff Cathedral.

== Personal life ==
Despite spending much of his time in London, linked to his parliamentary and judicial duties, and the fact that Nicholl held all his political seats in England, he continued to foster and support links with his home country of Wales. In 1787 he married Judy Birt, the youngest daughter of Peter Birt of Wenvoe Castle, and spent his time during his political career split between his London town house and Tondu House in South Wales.

Nicholl and Judy had one son and three daughters. Nicholl's only son, also John Nicholl, would later follow his father's political career, becoming a Member of Parliament for Cardiff.

=== Merthyr Mawr House ===
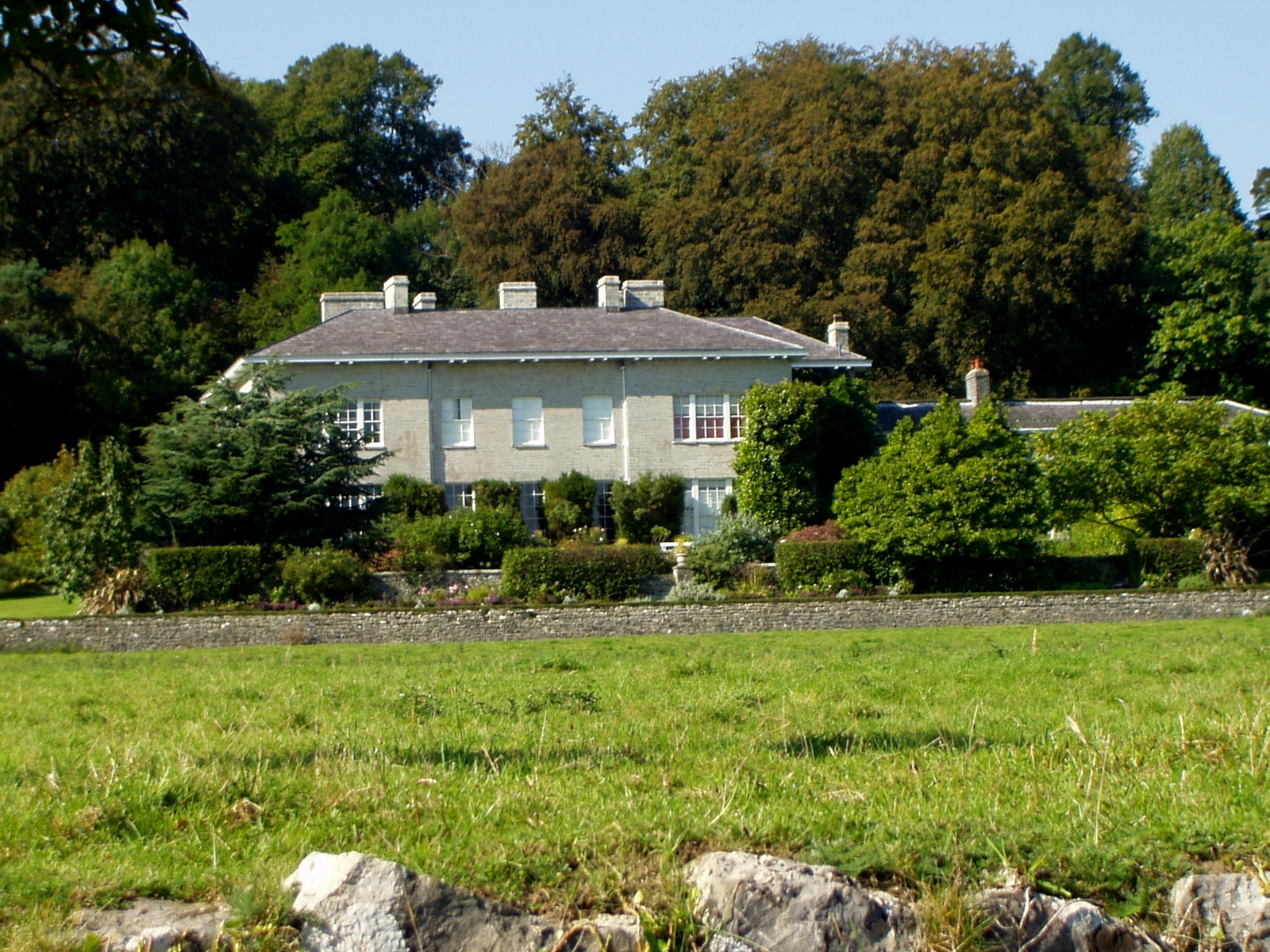
Merthyr Mawr House

Nicholl had amassed several estates throughout his lifetime, mainly through inheritance. He had gained an interest in property in Llantwit Major from his godfather, the Rev John Nicholl in 1770 and when Edward Powell died in 1771, he too left estates to Nicholl in five local parishes, including Tondu House. But despite these holdings, when Nicholl came to building his own family home, he chose the area of Merthyr Mawr. When Charles Bowen died in 1797, Nicholl was a trustee appointed to effect the will. Bowen owned large estates within Merthyr Mawr, but they were heavily mortgaged and there were additional debts and legacies to be honoured. Nicholl took this opportunity to purchase 800 acres (3.2 km^{2}) of the estate, eventually agreed at £18,000.

Nicholl initiated plans to construct a country house on the estate in 1806, demolishing the old residence, a 16th/17th century hall of the Stradling family, and hiring architect Henry Wood to build Merthyr Mawr House. Wood and Nicholl parted company in 1808, but Nicholl pushed through with his plans and moved into the incomplete building in 1809. When the mansion was completed it was notable for its library, which was reported as holding 30,000 articles.

Maerthyr Mawr house is a five bay, two-storey classical mansion faced in white local carboniferous limestone, with a hipped roof and a sash windows, and central single-storey porch with Tuscan columns in the north front. The mansion and its outlying stables are presently classed as Grade II* listed buildings.

Parliament of the United Kingdom
Preceded by Thomas Wallace; William Meeke	Member of Parliament for Penryn; 1802–1806; With: Sir Stephen Lushington	Succeeded by Henry Swann; Sir Christopher Hawkins
Preceded by Sir George Gunning, Bt The Lord Glenbervie	Member of Parliament for Hastings; 1806–1807; With: Sir William Fowle Middleton, Bt	Succeeded by George Canning; Sir Abraham Hume, Bt
Preceded by Sir Vicary Gibbs; James Henry Leigh	Member of Parliament for Great Bedwyn; 1806–1832; With: John Jacob Buxton	Constituency abolished
