= Gwaelod =

Gwaelod may refer to:

- Cantre'r Gwaelod, legendary ancient sunken kingdom in what is now Cardigan Bay to the west of Wales
- Gwaelod-y-Garth (Welsh for Foot of the Garth), village in the parish of Pentyrch, Cardiff in Wales
- Llanfihangel-Yn-Y-Gwaelod, village to the west of the city of Cardiff, Wales
