= Wenvoe Quarry =

Quarry in South Wales

Coordinates: 51.459°N 3.248°W

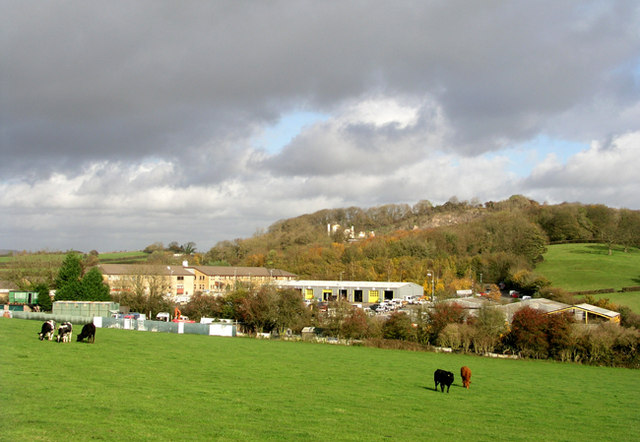
Looking towards Wenvoe Quarry (beyond the trees)

Wenvoe Quarry, formerly known as Alps Quarry, is a quarry located on the eastern edge of the Vale of Glamorgan, south Wales, approximately 5 km (3 miles) southwest of Cardiff city centre. It is situated on Alps Quarry Road, in an area known as "The Alps", between Wenvoe, Culverhouse Cross and Caerau. The quarry is accessed from the A4050 road.

The now-closed Whitehall Quarry, located 1 km (0.6 miles) to the west, was also known as Wenvoe Quarry.

== Current status ==
Wenvoe Quarry is managed by Breedon Group, and the mineral rights are owned by the Wenvoe Castle Estate.

The quarry has not been in production since the end of 2023. The quarry formerly extracted limestone rock, from which a variety of construction aggregates were produced.

The quarry is divided into two key areas, which are connected by a tunnel. The most recent extraction area was at the eastern margin of the site. Older quarry workings at the western margin of the site were used for processing rock and for stockpiling aggregates.

== Geology and terrain ==
The quarry extracted carboniferous limestone from the Friar's Point Limestone formation, which lies towards the upper boundary of the Black Rock Limestone Subgroup, itself a constituent of the Pembroke Limestone Group. The Friar's Point Limestone formation was deposited between 358.9 and 344.5 million years ago. The quarry worked a portion of the formation that occurs at the surface as an inlier, surrounded by the younger rocks of the Mercia Mudstone Group. The eastern edge of the inlier is bounded by the Penarth Fault.

The limestone formation at the quarry is around 265 m thick and has a dip of approximately 30° to the horizontal, towards the west. As a result of the limestone's relative durability compared to the Mercia Mudstone Group, together with the dip of the formation to the west and the sharp boundary against the Penarth Fault to the east, the limestone is expressed as a prominent ridge which runs roughly north-northwest to south-southeast and stands proud of the surrounding terrain by up to 60 m. The eastern boundary of the limestone forms a moderately steep escarpment. Within the quarry boundary, the limestone is covered by as little as 5 cm of soil.

Water running off the ridge drains to the Bullcroft Brook to the east and to the headwaters of the Wrinstone Brook to the west. The two brooks combine downstream to form the Cadoxton River, which discharges to the Bristol Channel at The Bendricks near Barry.

The quarry is bounded on all sides by agricultural fields and dense woodland.

== History of quarrying ==
An Ordnance Survey map that was surveyed in 1878–79 shows small quarry workings and a lime kiln alongside what became known as Alps Quarry Road.

Commercial-scale operations at the Alps quarry started in the 1880s. It was an important source of stone for construction projects, including the building of the No.1 Dock at Barry Docks. In 1889 the quarry employed some 200 men.

An 1898 Ordnance Survey map revision shows the quarry workings had significantly expanded, with multiple tramways within the quarry. Stone was conveyed down an inclined tramway to be loaded onto wagons on the Barry Railway close to the southern entrance of the Wenvoe Tunnel. Waste rock was deposited on land on several sides of the quarry.

A revised Ordnance Survey map of 1915 records "Alps Quarry (disused)".

Commercial quarrying was resumed by Amalgamated Aggregates in 1976, with the development of the eastern extraction area. Quarrying operations were continuous from then, under various operating companies, until the cessation of production at the end of 2023.

== 1889 accident ==
At around midday on 15 August 1889 three men, Charles Harding, George Richards and James Wills, were killed while boring a hole for blasting purposes, about 10 feet (3 m) from the face of the quarry. Large boulders fell on them and they fell to the bottom of the quarry, some 60 feet (18 m) below, and were crushed, two of them beyond recognition. Harding was rescued alive, but died about an hour later from a fractured skull and complications shortly before arriving in hospital.

== Nearby features ==
Coed-y-Cymdda was an archaeological site comprising an earthwork hill-slope enclosure dating from the late Bronze Age, located on the southwest-facing flank of the ridge that now hosts the Wenvoe Quarry. The archaeological site was excavated prior to its destruction by quarrying operations in 1978–1980. Archaeological finds indicated activity on the site until the Roman period.

A pair of lime kilns, presumably those recorded in the Ordnance Survey map of 1885, are located adjacent to the quarry entrance. The kiln draw arches were re-faced and incorporated into the wall of the quarry, although the chambers have partially collapsed.

The Wenvoe Iron Ore Mine was a small mining operation located on the northeast flank of the ridge, facing the Cwrt-yr-Ala road. The operation mined haematite intermittently in the mid to late 1800s, by both surface (opencast) and underground workings, the latter accessed by several levels. An inclined mineral tramway accessed the surface workings high on the ridge. In 1979, as quarrying progressed, the Alps Quarry broke into the underground iron ore workings. Few remains of the mine are visible today.

The main line of the Barry Railway opened in 1889, running from Trehafod in the Rhondda valley to Barry. It was chiefly a mineral railway, carrying large volumes of coal to be shipped from Barry Docks, although it also carried sparse passenger services. There was a station at Wenvoe. The main line ran for part of its length through the Wenvoe Tunnel, which had its southern portal approximately 250 m southwest of the present quarry entrance. The line was closed in 1963 but the tunnel and southern portal survive.

The war memorial in Wenvoe village was constructed of limestone from the quarry.
