= Herbert Jenner-Fust =

English judge

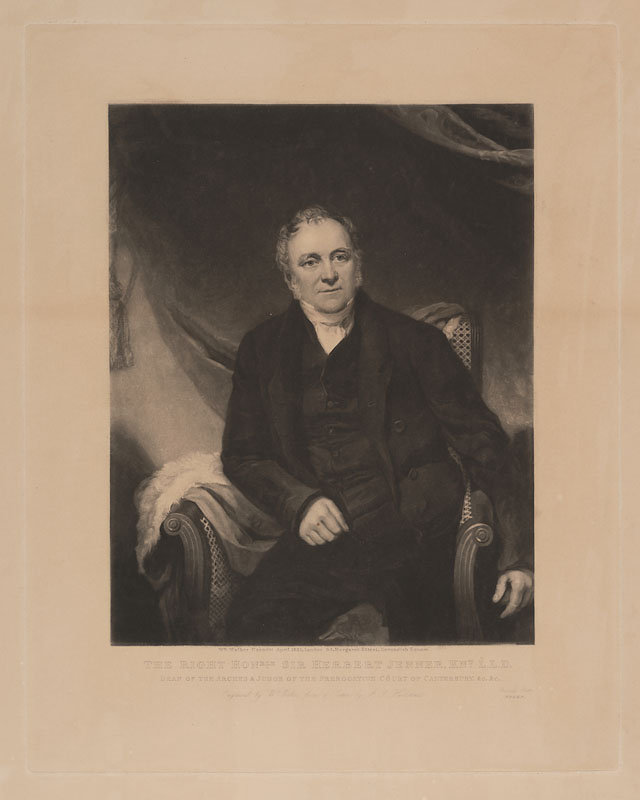
Sir Herbert Jenner-Fust, engraving by William Walker after Frederick Yeates Hurlstone.

Sir Herbert Jenner-Fust (born Herbert Jenner; 1778–1852), was an English judge and Dean of the Arches.

== Early life ==
Jenner-Fust, surname initially Jenner, was the second son of Robert Jenner of Doctors' Commons, proctor, and of Chislehurst, Kent, by his second wife, Ann, eldest daughter of Peter Birt of Wenvoe Castle, Glamorganshire. He was born in the parish of St. Gregory, near St Paul's Cathedral, in the City of London, on 4 February 1778. He was educated under Richard Valpy at Reading and at Trinity Hall, Cambridge, where he graduated LL.B. in 1798, and LL.D. in 1803.

== Legal career ==
He was called to the bar at Gray's Inn on 27 November 1800, admitted an advocate in the ecclesiastical and admiralty courts, and a fellow of the College of Doctors of Law on 8 July 1803. On 28 February 1828 he was appointed king's advocate-general, and knighted on the same day at St. James's Palace by George IV. He became vicar-general to the Archbishop of Canterbury in 1832, but resigned that place and the office of advocate-general on 21 October 1834, on his appointment as official principal of the arches and judge of prerogative court of Canterbury. On the 29th of the same month his name was added to the list of privy councillors.

He assumed the additional surname of Fust on 14 January 1842 on succeeding to Hill Court, Gloucestershire, and Capenor Court, Somersetshire, which had belonged to his deceased cousin, Sir John Fust. The fellows of Trinity Hall elected him Master in February 1843; but he never resided there, although he held this appointment, in conjunction with the deanery of the arches, to his decease. His name came very prominently before the public in the Gorham case, Gorham v. the Bishop of Exeter. In this case, which lasted three years (1847–50), Henry Phillpotts, charging the clergyman George Cornelius Gorham with heresy, refused to institute him to the vicarage of Brampford Speke, Devonshire. In the end Gorham was instituted on 7 August 1850, under an order made by the dean of the arches. Fust's decree of 2 August 1849 in this matter was the subject of much debate, and led to the publication of at least eighty pamphlets.

== Later life and death ==
In his latter days he became so infirm that he had to be carried in and out of his court by two footmen. He was an authority on international law, on which he was consulted by politicians.

Jenner-Fust died at 1 Chesterfield Street, Mayfair, London, 20 February 1852, and was buried in the family vault at St. Nicholas, Chislehurst, Kent, on 26 February.

== Family ==
He married on 14 September 1803 Elizabeth, daughter of Lieutenant-General Francis Lascelles. She was born on 30 March 1784, and died at Chislehurst on 29 July 1828. Their children included Anne and Charlotte. Anne's son, Charles Nepean was a Middlesex county cricketer who also played football, and was on the winning side in the 1874 FA Cup Final.

Jenner-Fust was the grandfather of Henry Jenner.

== Publications ==
The names of Fust and of Jenner-Fust are found in print in connection with the following cases:

- ‘A Letter to the Archbishop of Canterbury in Refutation of Opinions delivered in the case of Breeks v. Woolfrey respecting Praying for the Dead,’ 1839.
- ‘The Indeterminateness of Unauthorised Baptism occasioned by the Decision in the case of Mastin v. Escott,’ 1841.
- ‘Report of the Trial of Doe on the demise of H. F. Bather, plaintiff, and Brayne and J. Edwards, defendants, with reference to the will of W. Brayne,’ 1848.
- ‘Notices of the late Judgment in the case of Gorham v. the Bishop of Exeter; by J. King,’ 1849.
- ‘The Sacrament of Baptism considered in reference to the Judgment of Sir H. Jenner-Fust; by H. Phillpotts, Bishop of Exeter,’ 1849.
- ‘Gorham, clerk, against the Bishop of Exeter; the Judgment delivered in the Arches Court,’ 1849.
- ‘Review of the Judgment in the case of Gorham v. the Bishop of Exeter; by the Editor of the “Christian Observer,” i.e. William Goode, jun.,’ 1850.
- ‘A Medical Man, Dr. S. Ashwell, obtains a Will from a sick Lady during the absence of her Husband, whom he deprives of 25,000l. Judgment of Sir H. Jenner-Fust,’ 1850.
- ‘Judgment in the Prerogative Court in the cause Cursham v. Williams and Chouler,’ 1851.

Academic offices
Preceded by Thomas Le Blanc	Master of Trinity Hall, Cambridge; 1843–1852	Succeeded by Thomas Charles Geldart
