= Elizabeth Manning =

Elizabeth Manning may refer to:

- Elizabeth Adelaide Manning (1828–1905), British writer and editor
- Dame Elizabeth Leah Manning (1886–1977), British politician
- Elizabeth Manning (1747–1805), the subject of the legal case White v Driver
