= Chesterfield Street =

Street in Mayfair, London

Coordinates: 51.5070°N 0.1484°W

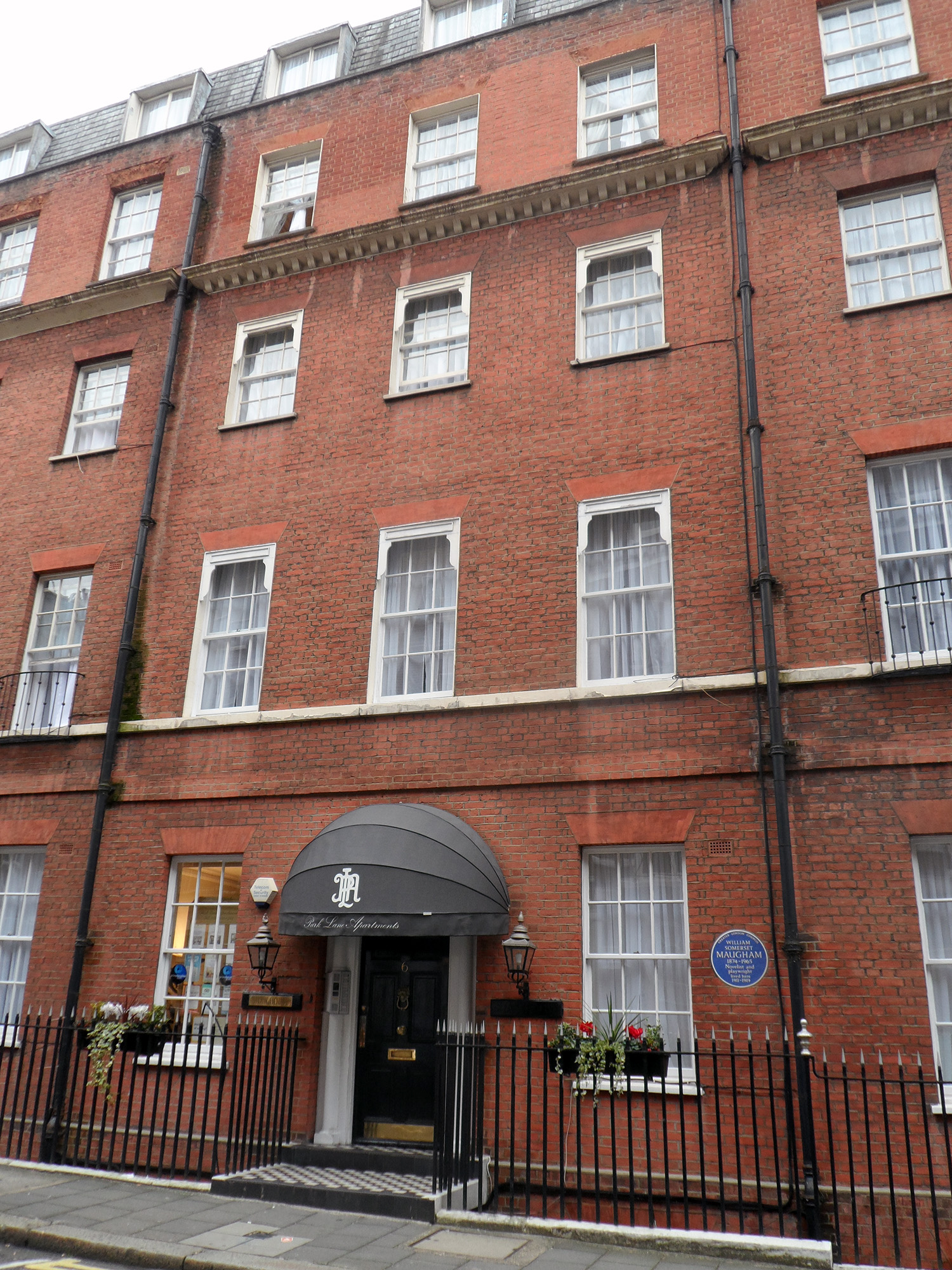
6 Chesterfield Street, with W. Somerset Maugham blue plaque

Chesterfield Street is a "virtually intact" Georgian street (except for No. 6, which is a reconstruction) in London's Mayfair district. Several of the buildings are Grade II listed on the National Heritage List for England.

== Location ==
Chesterfield Street runs south to north from Curzon Street to Charles Street.

== History ==
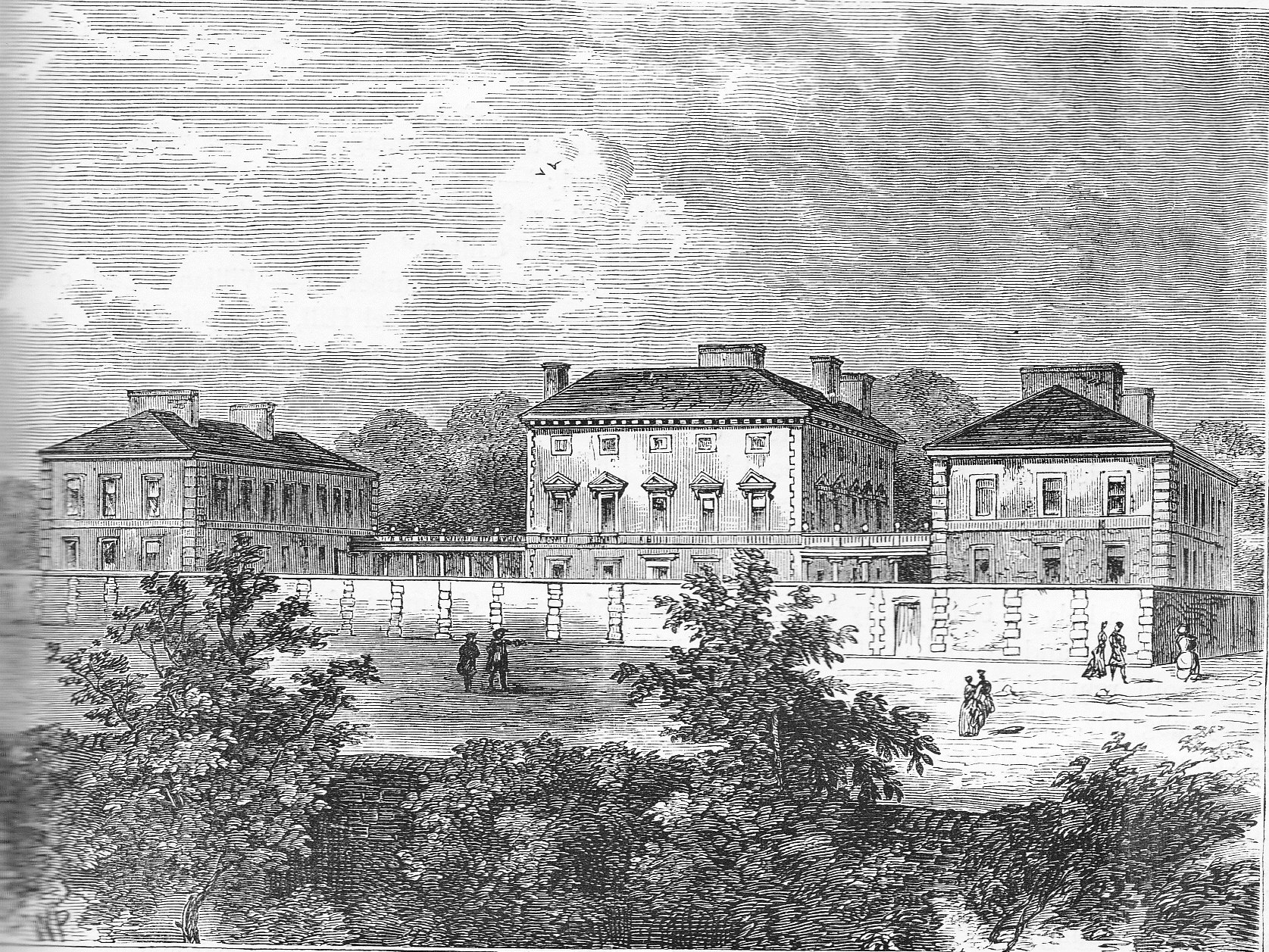
Chesterfield House in 1760, published in Walford's Old & New London (1878)

It is named after Philip Stanhope, 4th Earl of Chesterfield, and bounded the grounds to the east of what was Chesterfield House.

== Notable buildings ==
The gentleman's club White's was founded at No. 4 in 1693; in 1778 it moved to 37–38 St James's Street.

The High Commission of The Bahamas is at No. 10.

The individual listed buildings on Chesterfield Street are 1, 2, 10, 11, 14, and 15. 8 and 9 and 12 and 13 Chesterfield Street are listed in pairs.

== Notable residents ==
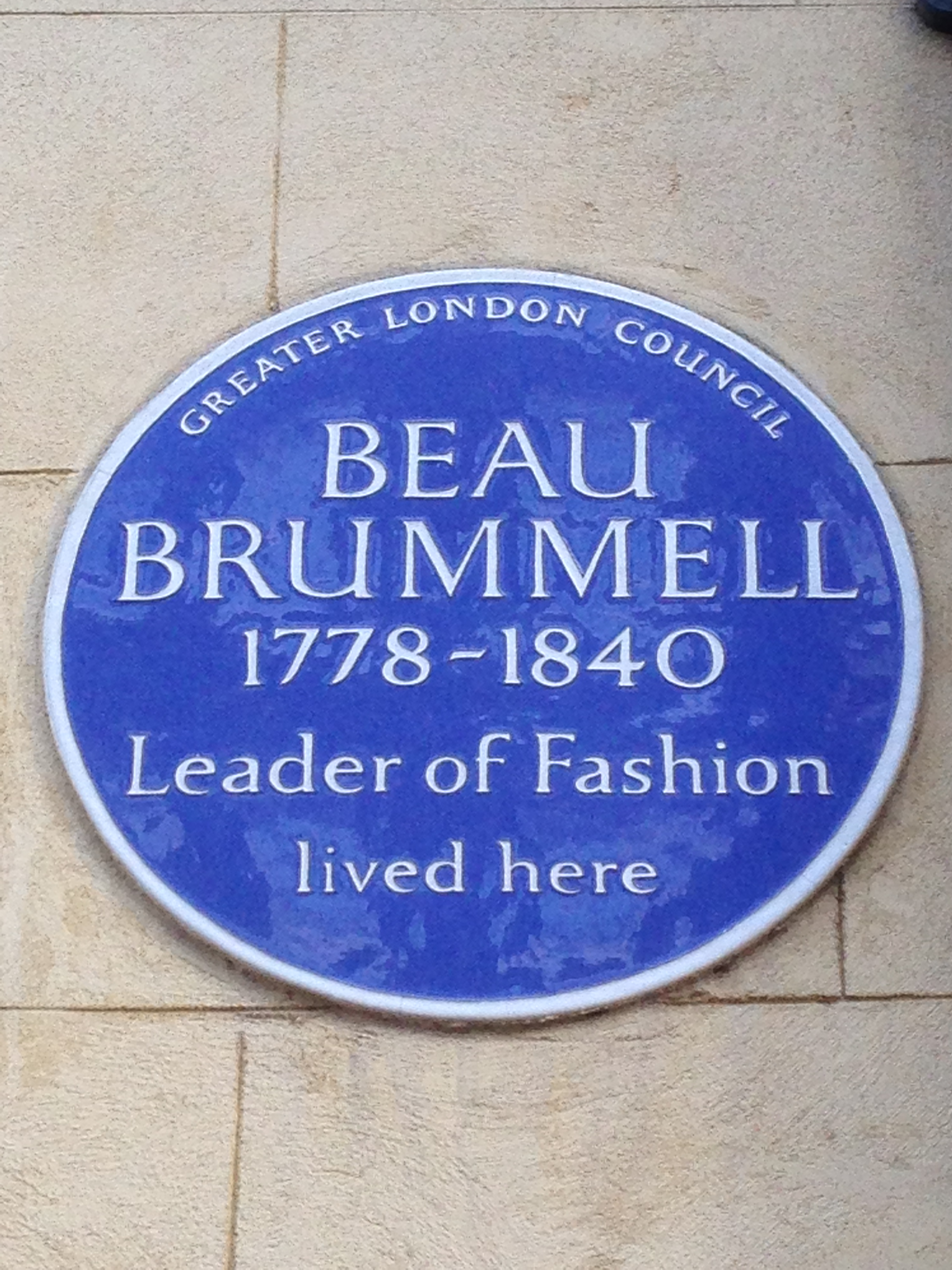
Beau Brummell blue plaque at No. 4

Notable residents have included Beau Brummell, the Earl of Dundonald and the Indian businessman Neeraj Kanwar.

Sir Rodney Mundy, Admiral of the Fleet died at his home in Chesterfield Street in 1884.

- No. 1, Lord Dudley
- No. 1, Herbert Jenner-Fust, judge, died there in 1852.
- No. 3, Caroline Norton, social reformer and author
- No. 4, Beau Brummell
- No. 4, Anthony Eden, prime minister, lived there 1955–57.
- No. 4, The Duke of Devonshire lived there in the late 1990s.
- No. 6, W. Somerset Maugham, novelist and playwright, lived there 1911–19.
- No. 7, Ivy Cavendish-Bentinck, Duchess of Portland
- No. 8, Francis Douglas, Viscount Drumlanrig, eldest son of John Douglas, 9th Marquess of Queensberry, was born there.
- No. 11, Sir Robert Adair, diplomat
