= Wenvoe Castle Golf Club =

Coordinates: 51°26′12″N 3°16′23″W

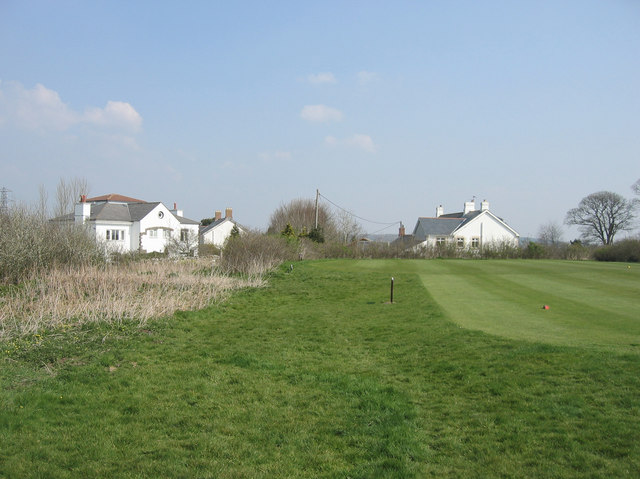

Wenvoe Castle Golf Club is an 18-hole golf course near Barry and Wenvoe in the Vale of Glamorgan off the A4050 road, situated to the south of Cardiff, the capital of Wales. The club was founded in 1936 around Wenvoe Castle, a mansion that was the home of Hugh Jenner, the club's first president.

Wenvoe Castle is a parkland course designed by James Braid. The course opens with a par five hole with a tee-off from an elevated tee to an undulating fairway, leaving two shots to make the guarded green. The front nine can be quite hilly and there are a few tough examinations in place while the inward nine is flatter and finishes with a dogleg par four. It has hosted numerous championships, including the Welsh foursomes championship in 2007. The club often hosts parties and buffets.
