= Murch =

Murch is a surname. Notable people with the surname include:

- Anna Valentina Murch (1949–2014), artist
- Arthur Murch (1902–1989), Australian artist
- Arthur Murch (illustrator) (1836-1885), English illustrator
- Craig Murch (born 1993) English hammer thrower
- Jamie Murch (born 1975), Australian cricketer
- Nigel Murch (1944–2020), Australian cricketer
- Simmy Murch (1880–1939), baseball player
- Thompson H. Murch (1838–1886), politician, stonecutter, editor, publisher, and merchant from Maine
- Walter Murch (born 1943), Academy Award-winning film editor/sound designer
- Walter Tandy Murch (1907–1967), still life painter
