= Robert Jenner (ice hockey) =

English ice hockey player

- Position: Defence
- EPIHL team: Romford Raiders
- Playing career: 2000–present

Robert Jenner (born 1985 in London), is an English hockey player with the Romford Raiders of the EPIHL. Jenner played his first senior game for the Raiders in 2000 and has progressed well since. Despite still being eligible to play for the Under-19's he was registered to play for the Raiders the previous season.
