= The Bendricks =

Coastline in the Vale of Glamorgan, Wales

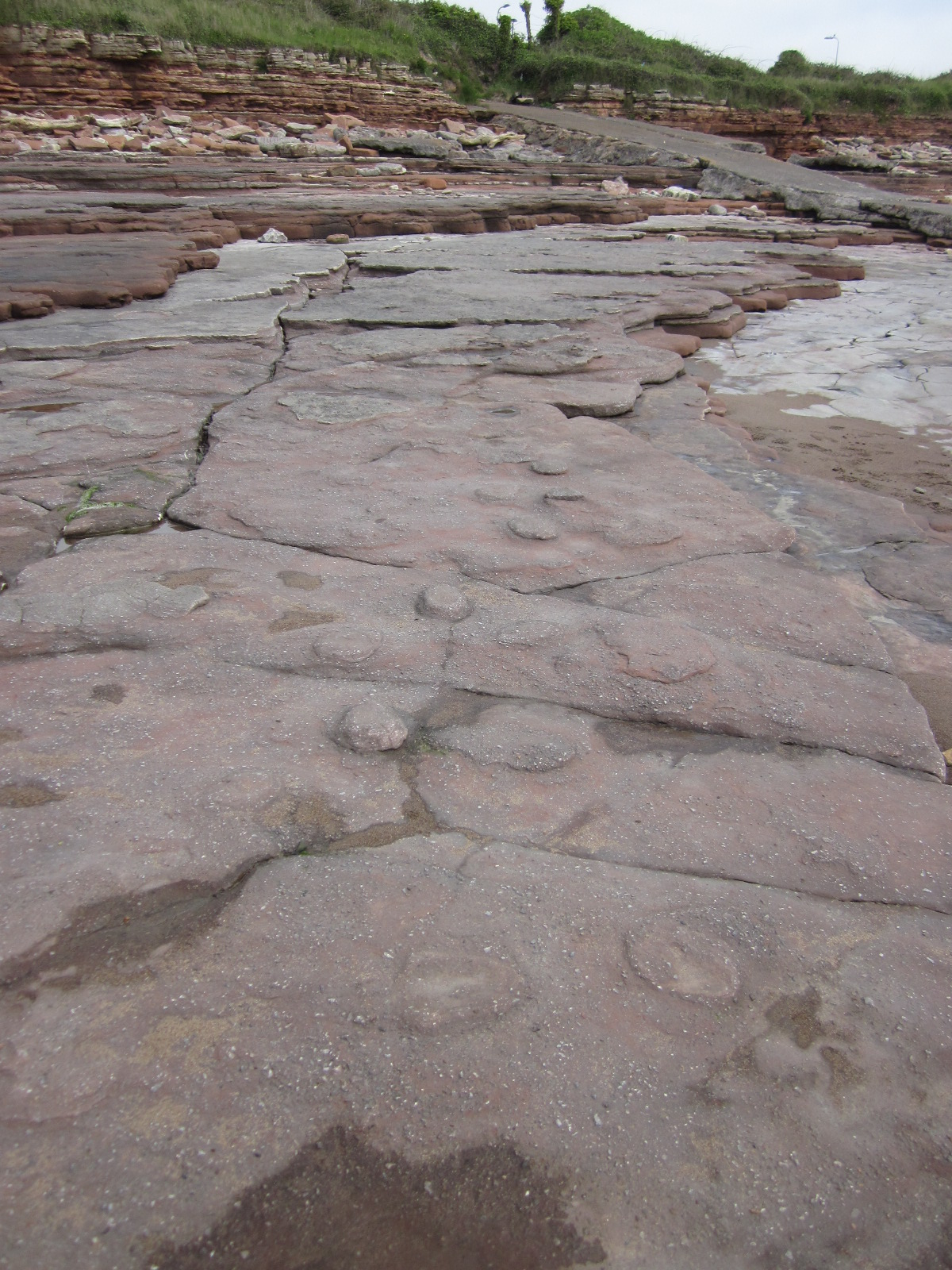
Dinosaur footprints

The Bendricks is a stretch of coastline and an important paleontological site in the Vale of Glamorgan in south Wales located along the northern coast of the Bristol Channel between Barry and Sully at 51°23′46″N 3°14′50″W . It lies at the foreshore of the industrial port of Barry between the eastern breakwater of the Barry docks entrance on its western edge to Hayes Point on its eastern edge. This area of the coast is a Site of Special Scientific Interest.

== Geology and topography ==
A tidal promontory of Carboniferous Limestone known as Bendrick Rock (Welsh: Craig Bendrick) juts out from the mainland here. Only the highest part of the promontory at its seaward end normally remains visible at high tide, though the highest spring tides cover it entirely. The geology of the Bendricks consists primarily of mudstones, siltstones and conglomerates (Mercia Mudstone marginal facies) formed primarily by deposition of silt at the shoreline of a shallow muddy sea during the Early and Late epochs of the Triassic period.

The Cadoxton River now enters the Bristol Channel by a concrete channel at this point having been redirected during the construction of Barry Docks by the Barry Railway Company which began in 1884. Inland of the Bendricks are HMS Cambria and the former Sully Hospital

== Dinosaur footprints ==
The Bendricks is famous for the discovery of 220 million year old dinosaur footprints dating to the Late Triassic (Norian), some of which have been removed to the National Museum and Galleries of Wales in Cardiff. The BBC featured these footprints and the geology of the Bendricks in its TV series about the Natural History of Wales. The footprints were first identified in 1974 and are deposited in the Triassic red beds and were made by the ichnospecies Anchisauripus, a small theropod, Grallator, also a small theropod, and Tetrasauripus, a sauropodomorph.

== Visiting ==
The Bendricks can be accessed via a path which follows the outside of the security fence round HMS Cambria at Hayes Point, Sully or by following the coastal path in a south-westerly direction from the public slipway at the Vale of Glamorgan recycling centre at Hayes Road, Sully.

The footprints can be difficult to see. Many are covered at high tide so it is easier to see them after high tide when the tracks may retain small puddles of water. It is also easier to spot the footprints when the sun is low in the sky as longer shadows will help throw the footprints into relief.

There is a small residential street known as Bendrick Road, consisting of around 50 houses.
