= White v Driver =

1809 English legal case

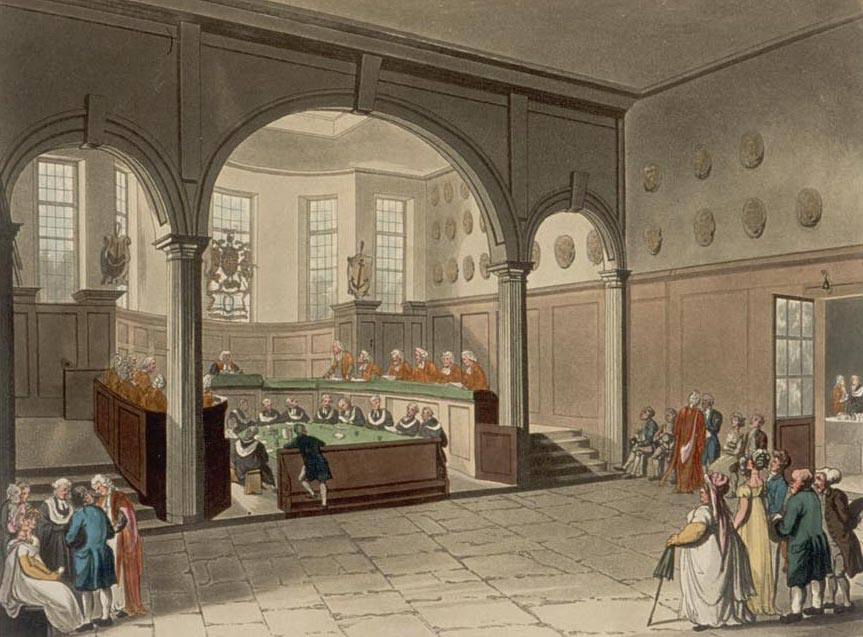
- Court: Prerogative Court of Canterbury
- Full case name: White and Twist v Driver and Driver, concerning the deceased Elizabeth Manning
- Decided: 3 July 1809
- Citation: Reports of Cases argued in the Ecclesiastical Courts

Court membership
- Judge sitting: Sir John Nicholl

Case opinions
- The will of an insane person is valid if the will is made in a period of lucidity, but the burden of proof lies in establishing the lucidity of the testator when making the will

White v Driver was a case decided in 1809 concerning a challenge to a will on the grounds of insanity. It laid down that if there was a previous history of insanity, the burden of proof lies in proving the sanity of the testator when making the will. The case was decided at Doctor's Commons under civil law, but continues to be quoted in the UK, Australia and in the US as recently as 2010.

== Facts of the case ==
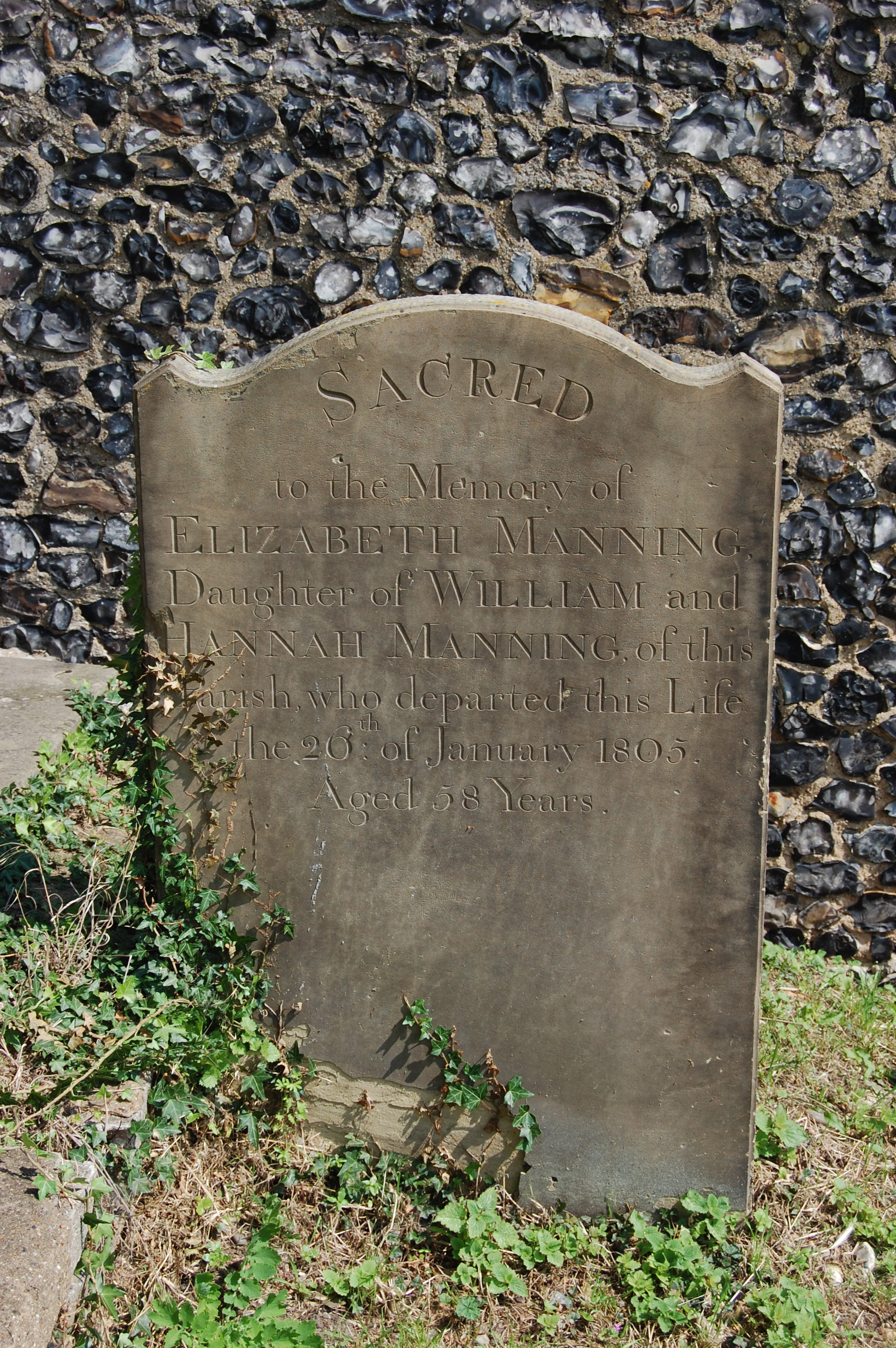
The gravestone of Elizabeth Manning in Chadwell St Mary churchyard

Elizabeth Manning died at the house of Edward Driver in Chadwell St Mary on 26 January 1805, the day after making a will. She left her estate to her nephew, her niece, and to their mother Margaret, who was Driver's wife but had previously been married to Elizabeth's brother, William. Her will excluded her two sisters. She had been advised to make a will by Eliezer Williams who was the curate of Chadwell. She had suffered from periods of insanity during the previous decade. The will was challenged by Manning's sisters on the grounds of her insanity.

The case is usually cited as White v Driver. Hannah White (formerly Manning) was the sister of Elizabeth Manning. Edward and Margaret Driver were the executor and executrix named in the will.

== Evidence ==
The court heard evidence for the plaintiffs that Manning had been earlier confined to the workhouse because of her insanity and had been forced to wear a straitjacket. There had also been complaints that her behaviour created a fire hazard for her neighbours.

The evidence for the defendants was that she had appeared lucid to a bank clerk when withdrawing money a few days before her death. There was also evidence from the curate that she appeared to be lucid when making her will. Other witnesses attested to her lucidity around the time the will was made.

== Verdict ==
The judge (Sir John Nicholl) ruled that where there was a previous history of insanity, the burden of proof rested with defendants to prove that the testator was sane when making the will. In this case, the will itself was reasonable even though it excluded her sisters. There was evidence from a number of witnesses of her lucidity in the days up to her making the will. He therefore ruled that the will was valid.
