= Wenvoe Tunnel =

Disused tunnel on the defunct Barry Railway

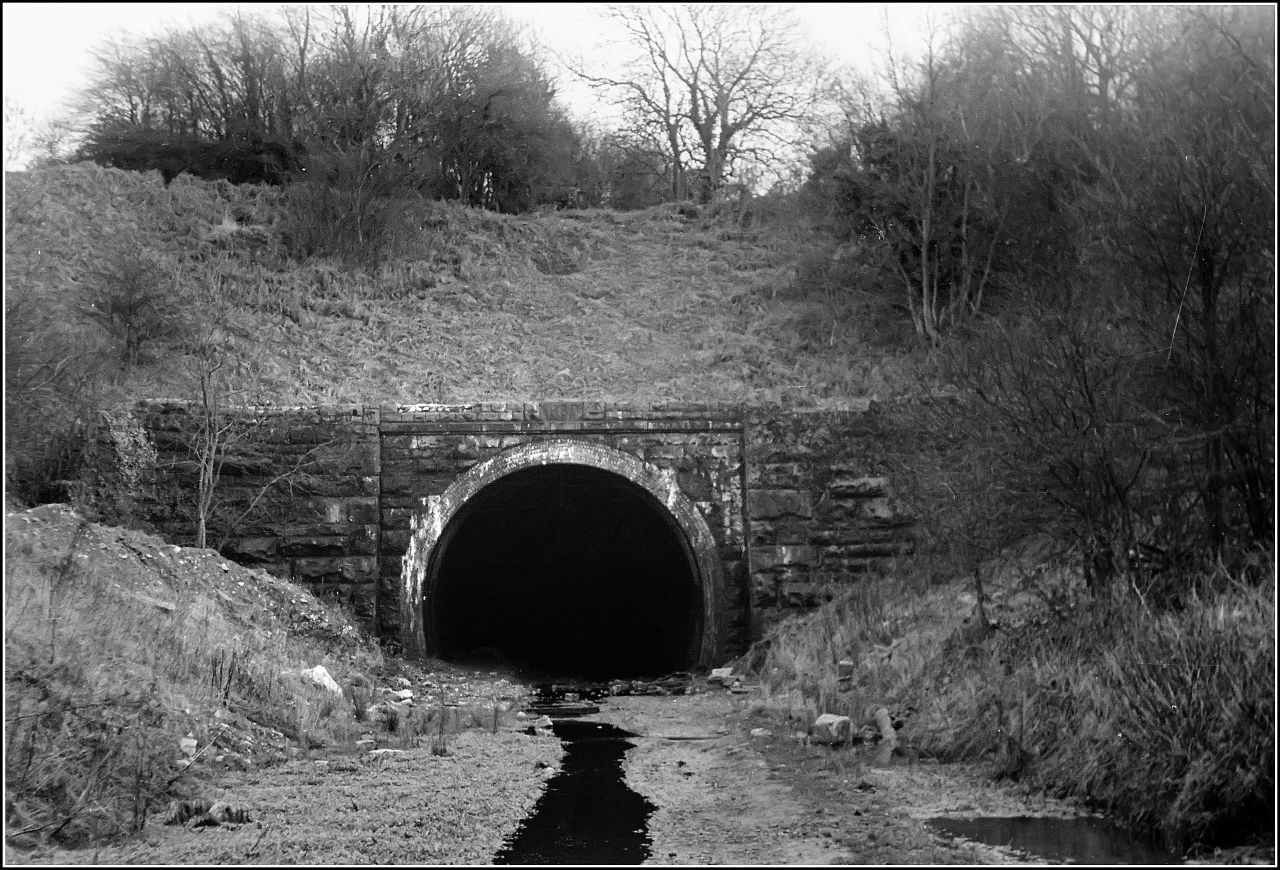
- North portal
- Interactive map of Wenvoe Tunnel

Overview
- Line: Barry Railway
- Location: Culverhouse Cross, Vale of Glamorgan, Wales
- Coordinates: S 51.457821°N 3.260892°W; N 51.469250°N 3.276423°W
- Status: Closed

Operation
- Opened: 1889
- Closed: 1963

Technical
- Length: 1,867 yards (1,707 m)

Wenvoe Tunnel is a disused tunnel on the defunct Barry Railway that runs under Culverhouse Cross in the Vale of Glamorgan in south Wales, on the western outskirts of Cardiff. It was opened in 1889 on a line used to carry coal to Barry Docks. The line also had a sparse passenger service and closed after March 1963.

== Description ==
The southern end of the tunnel is to the west of Wenvoe Quarry (formerly known as Alps Quarry) off Caerau Lane, and the northern end is north of Culverhouse Cross Retail Park, just west of the A4232 road and south east of the hamlet of Drope.

The tunnel passed under the A48 Cardiff–Cowbridge road and A4050 Cardiff–Barry road via Wenvoe and it carried the Barry Railway for 1867 yards through the downs before it crossed the River Ely on the Drope viaduct of 178 yards and St.Fagans viaduct of 180 yards over the South Wales main line and continued north to the coal fields but at just under half-mile north of its northern portal, a single line branch to Peterston-super-Ely ran to the west to connect with the former GWR South Wales main line.

Further still, at 1.35 miles from the northern portal, Tynycaeau Junction was the location of the divergence of the Cadoxton-Pontypridd line with the Penrhos Branch which ran to Caerphilly and the Rhymney valley.

Classed as a freight-only branch, over the years it passed many day passenger excursions to Barry Island from the Rhymney Valley and rail network beyond Rhymney.

Opened in August 1901, the 6-mile branch incorporated the 490-yard curved, Walnut Tree tunnel (now breached by quarry workings) and the magnificent 517-yard Walnut Tree viaduct bridging the Taff Gorge south of Taffs Well. By 1905, the Penrhos branch had been extended from Penrhos Junction (South) west of Caerphilly, to join the Brecon & Merthyr Railway at Llanbradach, again incorporating two engineering feats, the first of which was the 385-yard Penyrheol viaduct, south-west of Caerphilly and finally their impressive Llanbradach (or Pwll-y-Pant) viaduct, the length of which is subject to conjecture but an Institution of Civil Engineers Minutes of Proceedings document dated 11 February 1908, confirmed the length as 800 yards.

All three of these impressive viaducts were of steel spans supported on brick piers. Due to duplication of rail routes, following the 1922 GWR Grouping, the extension to the Brecon & Merthyr Railway was taken out of use on 4 August 1926 and the latter two viaducts had been demolished by 1937. Walnut Tree viaduct survived in use until December 1967 and was demolished in 1969.

The other main works on the former Barry Railway's Cadoxton-Trehafod railway were the Pontypridd (or Graig) tunnel 0.75 miles (1.21 km) at Treforest and a viaduct over the River Ely 534 feet (163 m) long and 62 feet (19 m) high. plus the St. Fagans viaduct mentioned above.

A British Rail Gazetteer says the tunnel, between Wenvoe and Drope Junction, is just over 1 mile (1.6 km) long, at 1,867 yards (1,707 m). More simply, the closed tunnel on the former Barry–Pontypridd route is 1,867 yards (1,707 m) long, the 9th longest Great Western tunnel.

It is brick-lined apart from a short section at the south end. It has an air shaft near the centre of its length, almost as wide as the tunnel. Its original air shaft chimney of circular red brick with Staffordshire blue corbelling, was removed following closure and a breeze-block structure built to the rear of a concrete-aproned area of a retail outlet and which at ground level, occupies an airway of only a quarter of the circular air shaft area below ground. As at 2020, a large bore concrete water main maintained by Welsh Water is run at tunnel ground level and against the east side of the bore.

Since falling out of use following 1963, the tunnel has suffered much flooding.

== Construction ==
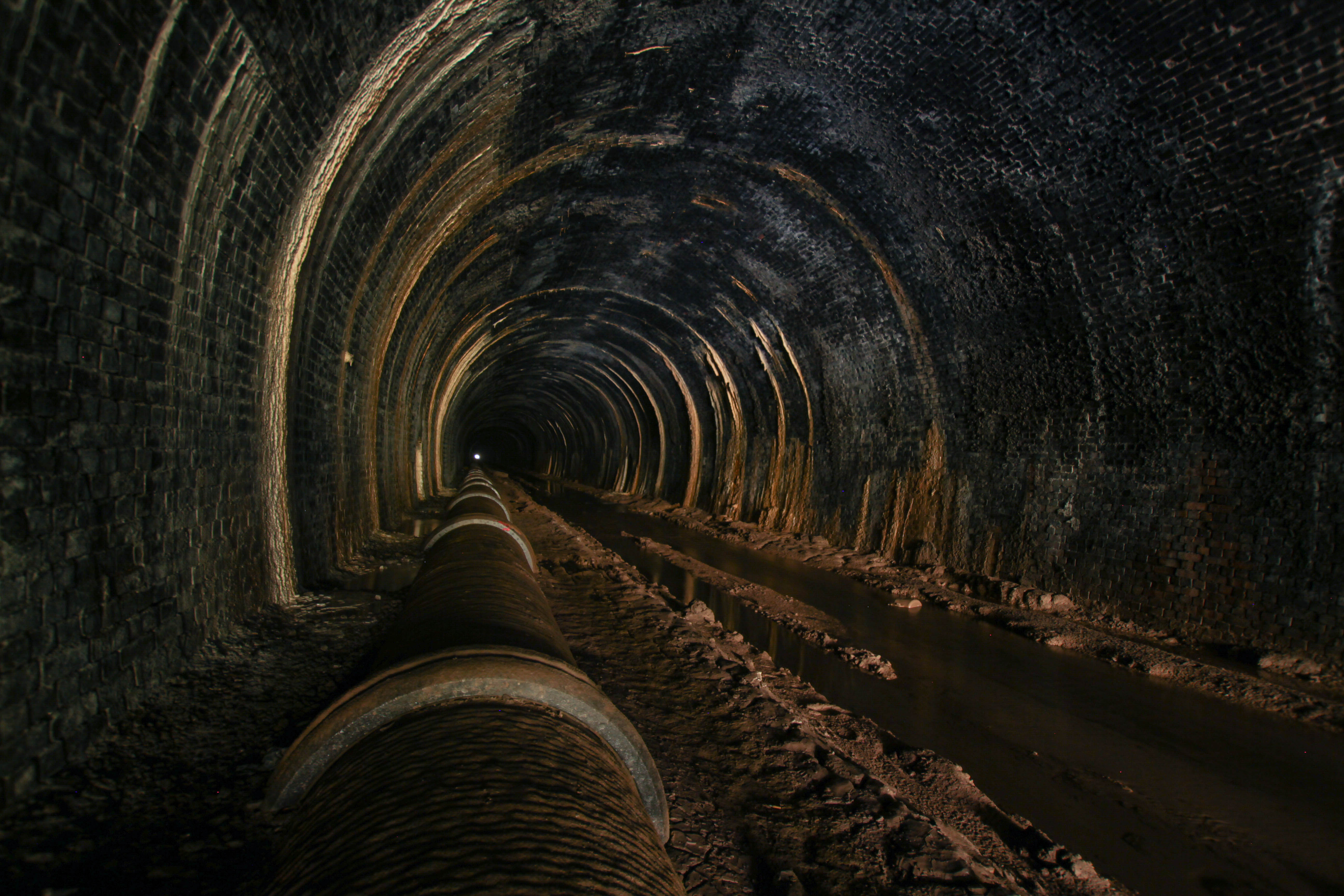
Tunnel interior in 2015

The Barry Docks and Barry Railway Company were founded to break the effective monopoly that the Taff Vale Railway and the Cardiff Docks had established over export of coal from the South Wales Coalfield. Work on the railway began in 1885, and within four years included an 18 1/2-mile (30 km) line from Trehafod to the Barry Docks, with several branch lines.

In July 1885, The Engineer reported that the heavy work at Wenvoe Tunnel was being pressed forward, and it was expected that there would soon be 3,000 men at work on the project. The earth was removed from the tunnel using skips that held 1 cubic yard (0.76 m^{3}) and ran on three 1-foot-9-inch (53 cm) roads, mostly pulled by ponies. The skips were run out to the tip, where they could be lifted by hand when off the road. Several pressurized oil lights were used to allow night work. In the deep cutting to the north they were connected to a pump that was used to clear water from the tunnel. In the rock cutting to the south they were connected to air compressors used to drive rock drills.

== History ==
The double-track tunnel was opened for service in 1889. It was closed following the destruction by fire on week ending 31 March 1963, of Tynycaeau Junction signal box. The stone above the north portal with the date of 1888 is now covered in moss and scarcely legible. The top of the ventilation shaft is enclosed in a concrete building in a retail parking lot in Culverhouse Cross. The tunnel contains a large water main. It is subject to flooding up to 4 feet (1.2 m) in depth after heavy rainfall.

== Sources ==
- Bell, James (1886), "Barry Dock and Railways", Reports and Transactions - Cardiff Naturalists ́Society
- England and Wales OS Six Inch, 1888-1913 National Library of Scotland
- Gazetteer: Tunnels, British Railways
- Institution of Civil Engineers (1894), Minutes of Proceedings of the Institution of Civil Engineers, The Institution
- Lygad, Dai (11 January 2016), "Underground history: Wenvoe Tunnel ventilation shaft, Culverhouse Cross, Cardiff", Djibouti web portal
- Mortimer, Dic (8 October 2014), Cardiff: The Biography, Amberley Publishing Limited, ISBN 978-1-4456-4251-2
- Nicholson, Nigel, Great Western Tunnels
- Our correspondent (1885), "Wales and Adjoining Counties", The Engineer
- Robinson, John (6 December 1887), "Illumination from Waste Oils", Journal of the Royal Society of Arts ..., G. Bell and Sons
- "Wenvoe tunnel", Fluidr
- "Wenvoe Tunnel", Forgotten Relics
