= Robert Francis Jenner =

British magistrate

High Sheriff of Glamorgan
- In office 1828–1828
- Preceded by: John Henry Vivian of Marino, Swansea
- Succeeded by: William Crawshay II of Cyfathfa Castle, Merthyr Tydfil

Personal details
- Born: 13 January 1802
- Died: 8 April 1860 (aged 58)
- Occupation: Magistrate

Robert Francis Jenner (13 January 1802 – 8 April 1860) of Wenvoe Castle was High Sheriff of Glamorgan in 1828.

== Family ==
The name "Jenner" is said to be the same as Genor or Genore. The Jenners of Wenvoe traced their ancestry back to Thomas Jenner of Northam, Sussex, who died about 1640. His grandson was Sir Thomas Jenner of Petersham, Surrey (1638–1707), a barrister and member of parliament for Rye in 1685. Thomas Jenner's grandson was Charles Jenner (1707–1770), Archdeacon of Huntingdon, Rector of Buckworth and Chaplain in Ordinary to King George II of Great Britain. Charles Jenner's son, the grandfather of Robert Francis Jenner, was Robert Jenner of Chislehurst, Kent (1743–1810) who married Ann Birt, daughter and co-heiress of Peter Birt of Airmyn, Yorkshire. Peter Birt had built Wenvoe Castle near Cardiff, Glamorgan, a stately mansion with a main front 374 feet (114 m) long and three storeys high, including two wings. (Note: The mansion named "Wenvoe Castle" was erected near the site of a much earlier Wenvoe Castle, of which no traces remain. Winwere, otherwise Wenno, or Wenvoe is noticed by John Leland, (Itin. vol. iv. p. 40, 2nd ed.) who wrote, "All the buildings of this Wenno standing on a little hille is downe saving one Towr & broken Waules.)

== Life ==
Robert Francis Jenner was born on 13 January 1802. He was the eldest son of Robert Jenner (1776–1824) of Wenvoe Castle, Glamorgan. His mother was Frances, eldest daughter of Major-General Francis Lascelles. Jenner attended Eton College and then Brasenose College, Oxford, graduating on 28 January 1820 at the age of 18. On 10 August 1824 Jenner married Elizabeth Lascelles (died 29 September 1850), eldest daughter of Sir Herbert Jenner-Fust, Dean of Arches. She was his double first cousin. They had ten sons and five daughters. One of the daughters, Emma, wrote of her mother: "She always thought the year wasted if there was not a new baby born." Jenner resided in Wenvoe Castle, and was a Justice of the Peace and Deputy Lieutenant for Glamorgan. In 1828 he was appointed High Sheriff of Glamorgan. Jenner was patron of St Mary's Church in the village of Jenner. Robert Francis Jenner died on 8 April 1860.

Robert Francis Lascelles Jenner (1826–83), his eldest son, was Chairman of the Barry Railway Company, incorporated on 5 July 1865 to build a 7.75 miles (12.47 km) mixed-gauge line to Barry from Peterston on the South Wales Railway. The project failed to get off the ground due to lack of funding.

== Sources ==
- Burke, Bernard (1894), A Genealogical and Heraldic History of the Landed Gentry of Great Britain & Ireland, Harrison, ISBN 9780394487267
- Burne, R. H. (19 June 1860), "Robert Francis Jenner, Esquire, Deceased" (PDF), The London Gazette
- Davis, Martin (2016), Caroline & Martin Davis's families
- Lewis, Samuel (1840), A Topographical Dictionary of Wales: Comprising the Several Counties, Cities, Boroughs, Corporate and Market Towns, Parishes, Chapelries, and Townships, with Historical and Statistical Descriptions, S. Lewis
- Speller, John (2016), Barry Railway
- Williams, W. Wynn (July 1852), "Outrageous Proceedings in the Time of Henry VI", Archaeologia Cambrensis, New Series (XI)
