= Wenvoe =

Wenvoe: Welsh: Gwenfô
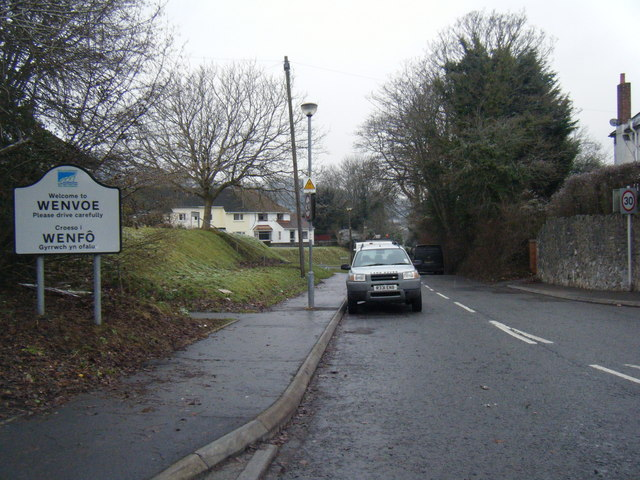

- Location within the Vale of Glamorgan
- Population: 1,850 (2011)
- Principal area: Vale of Glamorgan
- Preserved county: South Glamorgan
- Country: Wales
- Sovereign state: United Kingdom
- Post town: Cardiff
- Postcode district: CF5
- Dialling code: 029
- Police: South Wales
- Fire: South Wales
- Ambulance: Welsh
- UK Parliament: Vale of Glamorgan
- Senedd Cymru – Welsh Parliament: Vale of Glamorgan
- List of places UK Wales Vale of Glamorgan 51.45°N 3.27°W Map of the community

Wenvoe (Welsh: Gwenfô) is a village, community and electoral ward between Barry and Cardiff in the Vale of Glamorgan, Wales. Nearby are the Wenvoe Transmitter near Twyn-yr-Odyn and the site of the former HTV Wales Television Centre at Culverhouse Cross which is now a housing estate. It is home to the Wenvoe Quarry and Wenvoe Castle Golf Club.

== History ==
Maintaining a thriving farming community for centuries, Wenvoe, while still a farming village to an extent, has doubled in population in the last hundred years due to new housing developments.

The village originally developed around the parish church of St. Mary, which can be traced back to the twelfth century with the adjacent locality now being a conservation area. Wenvoe is recorded as having belonged to the De Sully, le Fleming and Malefaunt famililies in the later medieval periods. After being escheated to the crown the castle of Wenvoe belonged successively to the Thomas, Birt and Jenner families. Major development occurred in the 1770s but much of this was obliterated by a fire in 1910. Some medieval or earlier fortification is also known to have existed in the wooded hillside at Wrinstone.

On 15 August 1952 Wenvoe transmitting station broadcast television to Wales for the first time.

== Governance ==
An electoral ward with the same name exists. The total ward population taken at the 2011 census was 2,659, though in 2022 the neighbouring community of St Nicholas and Bonvilston was transferred to a new ward.

== Schools ==
Mary Immaculate High School is a Roman Catholic secondary school in Wenvoe, although it is administered by the neighbouring Cardiff local education authority, and most of its pupils are from the city.

Gwenfo Church in Wales Primary School is located in Wenvoe.

== Landmarks and attractions ==
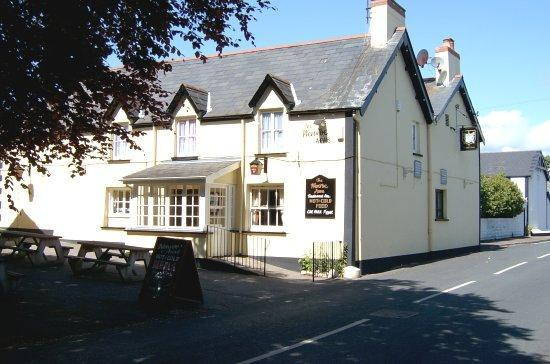
The Wenvoe Arms

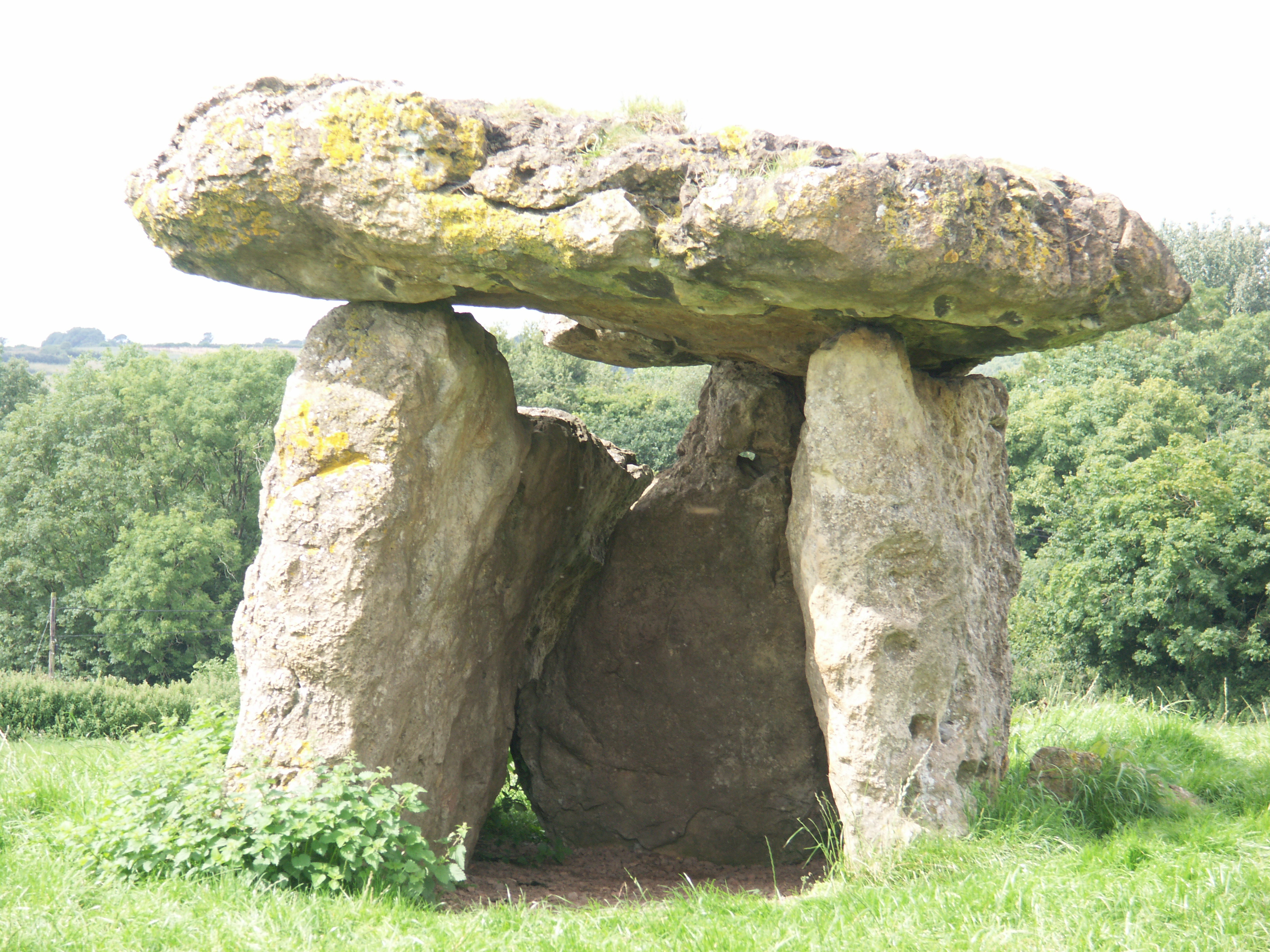
St Lythans burial chamber

The village has a village shop with a post office, a parish church, primary school, hotel, a part-time library, barber and three village halls.

It is home to three pubs (two that have been in the village for hundreds of years – The Wenvoe Arms and The Horse & Jockey at nearby Twyn-yr-Odyn, and the more recent Walston Castle) and many acres of forestry and fields. There is another church at St Lythans. A village show is held every September at the Community Centre hosted by the village Scout Group.

The St Lythans burial chamber is 2 km (1 1/4 miles) west of Wenvoe, or about 4.5 km (2.8 mi) by road, past the village of St Lythans. It is a single stone Megalithic dolmen, built around 6,000 years ago as part of a chambered long barrow, during the Neolithic period. The Tinkinswood burial chamber is about 3.5 km (2 1/2 miles) north west of Wenvoe, near the village of St Nicholas.

Near Tinkinswood burial chamber lies Dyffryn Gardens (partially in the Wenvoe community), to whose estate both burial chambers once belonged. Dyffryn Gardens were selected by the British Tourism Association as one of the Top 100 gardens in the UK.

== Notable people ==
- Robert Francis Jenner (1802–1860), High Sheriff of Glamorgan in 1827
- Edmund Thomas (1633–1677), politician who sat in the House of Commons in 1654 and 1656 and sat in Cromwell's Upper House
- Sir John Godfrey Thomas, sixth baronet of Wenvoe (died 1841)
- Sir Godfrey-Vignolles Thomas, 9th Baronet (1856–1919)
- Simon Cox, PGA European Tour golfer.

== See also ==
- Wenvoe Quarry
- Wenvoe railway station
- Wenvoe transmitting station
- Wenvoe Tunnel
