= Michaelston-le-Pit =

Coordinates: 51.449°N 3.222°W

Michaelston-le-Pit: Welsh: Llanfihangel-y-pwll
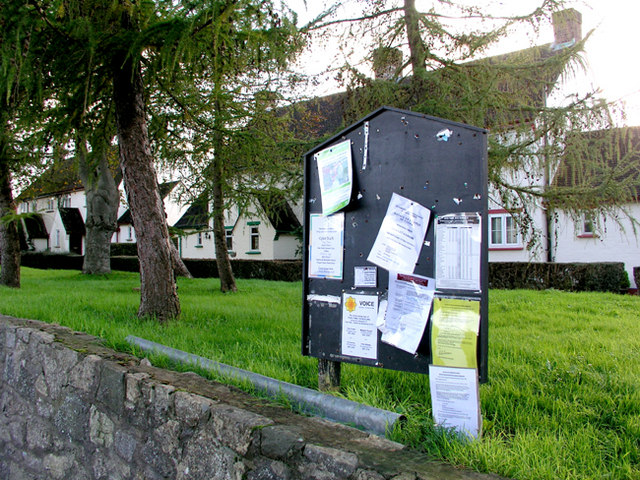
- Michaelston-le-Pit Village Green

- Location within the Vale of Glamorgan
- OS grid reference: ST152730
- Principal area: Vale of Glamorgan
- Preserved county: South Glamorgan
- Country: Wales
- Sovereign state: United Kingdom
- Postcode district: CF
- Police: South Wales
- Fire: South Wales
- Ambulance: Welsh
- UK Parliament: Vale of Glamorgan
- Senedd Cymru – Welsh Parliament: Vale of Glamorgan

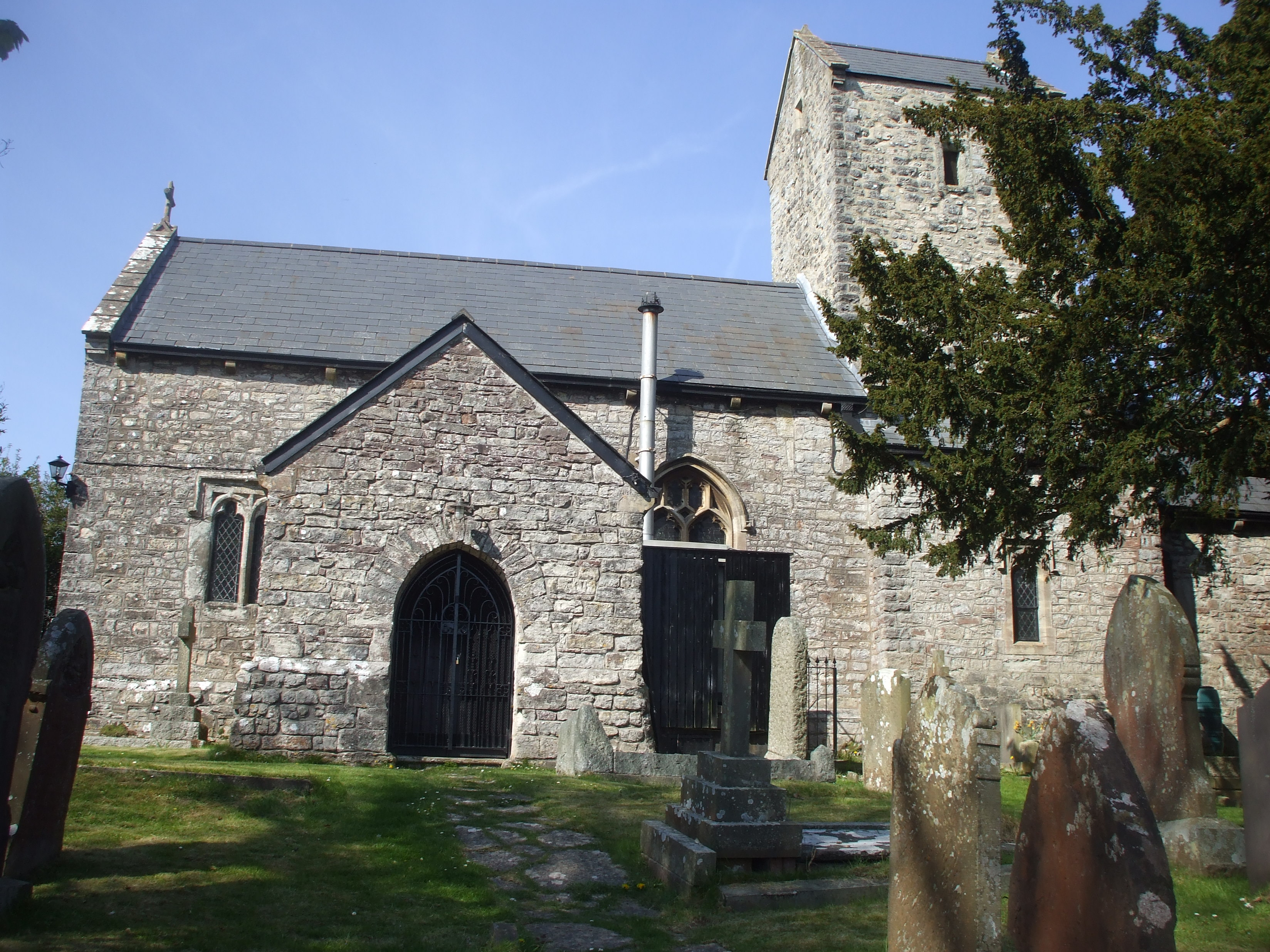
Church of St Michael & All Angels

Michaelston-le-Pit (Welsh: Llanfihangel-y-pwll) is a village in the Vale of Glamorgan, just to the west of the city of Cardiff, Wales. It is part of the Michaelston-le-Pit and Leckwith community. The community population taken at the 2011 census was 309.

To the south lies the town of Penarth, while to the south west lies the village of Dinas Powys. The Cwrt-yr-Ala estate stands to the west. The ancestral home of the Rous and Brain families, the estate was bought in the early 20th century by Sir Herbert Merrett, a Cardiff industrialist. In 1939, Merrett commissioned Percy Thomas to build him a new home on the site. Cwrt-yr-Ala House is a Grade II listed building and its gardens and grounds are listed, also at Grade II, on the Cadw/ICOMOS Register of Parks and Gardens of Special Historic Interest in Wales.

The village is built near the confluence of two small streams, which join to form the Cadoxton River. The French suffix is possibly derived from a clay pit near the southern end of the village, it having been settled on a Norman family, the De Raneghs, after the conquest.

Llanfihangel-y-pwll means The Church of St Michael and All Angels of the Pool or Pit. It is not to be confused with Latin suffixed Michaelston-super-Ely (Cardiff) or Welsh suffixed Michaelstone-y-Fedw (Newport).

== Notable people ==
Rev. Henry Holmes Stewart (1847–1937), who won the FA Cup with Wanderers in 1873, was rector at the parish church from 1925 to 1935.

The village was the home to former First Minister of Wales Rhodri Morgan.
