= Wenvoe Castle =

Castle in Vale of Glamorgan, south Wales

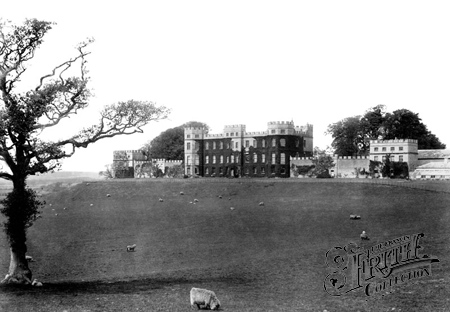
- Wenvoe Castle and estate in 1899

- Location within Vale of Glamorgan

General information
- Location: Near Wenvoe, Vale of Glamorgan, Wales
- Coordinates: 51°26′5″N 3°16′9″W
- Completed: 1776–77, 1928

Wenvoe Castle was a castle and country estate between Barry and Wenvoe, in the Vale of Glamorgan, south Wales. Today the former estate forms the Wenvoe Castle Golf Club. Goldsland lies on its western boundary.

== History ==
In the later medieval periods, Wenvoe is recorded as having belonged to three families: De Sully, le Fleming and Malefaunt. However, according to Clifford Spurgeon, it wasn't until the late 1530s that a castle at Wenvoe was mentioned, when it appeared in Leland's Itinerary. After being escheated to the crown, it belonged successively to the Thomas, Birt and Jenner families.

The Thomas family inherited the estate in 1560 when Jevan ap Harpway of Tresimont, Hertfordshire married Catherine, the only daughter and heiress of Thomas ap Thomas. They were prominent figures in the history of Glamorgan, amongst them Edmund Thomas (1633–1677), politician who sat in the House of Commons in 1654 and 1656 and sat in Cromwell's Upper House, Colonel Charles Nassau Thomas (died April 1820), vice chamberlain to the Prince of Wales (later King George IV) and Sir Godfrey-Vignolles Thomas, 9th Baronet (1856–1919).

In 1774, the Thomas family fell into debts and sold the estate to Peter Birt, a coal magnate of Yorkshire. Birt ordered the building of a new castle in 1776–77, under the design of architect Robert Adam, his only building in Wales. The Birts later passed the estate to the Jenner family in 1823/4, who were prominent in 19th century Glamorganshire, and give their name to a district of Barry today, Jenner Park. Robert Francis Jenner (1802–1860) was High Sheriff of Glamorgan in 1827.

Much of the building was obliterated by a 1910 fire. Nonetheless, restored in 1928 with its Georgian appearance, it is now used as the clubhouse. The Wenvoe Castle Golf Club was established in 1936, by the owner of the manor, Hugh Jenner. The castles gardens and park are designated Grade II on the Cadw/ICOMOS Register of Parks and Gardens of Special Historic Interest in Wales.
