= Sully and Lavernock =

- Community
- Principal area: Vale of Glamorgan
- Country: Wales
- Sovereign state: United Kingdom
- Police: South Wales
- Fire: South Wales
- Ambulance: Welsh
- List of places UK Wales Vale of Glamorgan Map of the community

Sully and Lavernock (Welsh: Sili a Larnog) is a community on the coast of the Vale of Glamorgan, Wales, stretching from Sully to Lavernock.

== Description ==
The community includes the village of Sully and the coastal hamlets of Swanbridge and Lavernock. At the 2001 UK Census the population of Sully and Lavernock was 4,240 rising to 4,543 in 2011. It also includes the Cosmeston area of Lavernock.

The community has a library based in Sully, Sully and Lavernock Community Library, which has been run by volunteers since 2016.

Notable buildings include the 1930s Sully Hospital, which is Grade II* listed. Sully's St John the Baptist church, the centre of the old village, is Grade II listed, as is Lavernock's Church of St Lawrence.

== Governance ==
=== Community Council ===
The community is represented at the local level by Sully and Lavernock Community Council comprising nine councillors elected from the community wards of Sully (7), and Lavernock (2).

In 2017 and 2018 the council experienced problems including the suspension of and investigation into the conduct of the council clerk in September 2017. Other problems includes an out-of-date asset list and loss of insurance paperwork. Local residents called for the council to be disbanded at a public meeting in April 2018. The suspension of the clerk on full pay, for alleged misuse of his work computer, was said to be on the verge of bankrupting the council by early 2019.

A by-election took place on 15 March 2018 following the resignation of a councillor. It was won by retired police officer, Steve Oaten. Councillor Oaten became chairman of the community council, but resigned in February 2019 citing "the overbearing conduct and behaviour" of some councillors and saying the council needed "a few new faces".

=== Vale of Glamorgan Council ===
Sully and Lavernock is in the electoral ward of Sully for elections to the Vale of Glamorgan Council. Two county councillors are elected.

=== Cardiff RDC ===
Prior to 1974, Sully and Lavernock was a ward to Cardiff Rural District Council, electing one councillor. At the May 1970 elections it re-elected Independent councillor, Mrs P. M. W. Winn-Jones.
