= 1937 Glamorgan County Council election =

1937 Welsh local government election

The sixteenth election to Glamorgan County Council, south Wales, took place in March 1937. It was preceded by the 1934 election and followed, due to the Second World War by the 1946 election.

== Overview ==
Labour's comfortable majority on the council, including the aldermanic bench, remained unchanged.

== Boundary changes ==
There were no boundary changes at this election.

== Candidates ==
Many candidates were returned unopposed.

== Contested elections ==
Labour contested almost every seat on the council, with a significant proportion of candidates returned unopposed.

Of the eleven aldermen retiring at the end of their sixth year term, the ten Labour aldermen all sought re-election while Rev D.H. Williams (Ind) stood down from the Council after over thirty years. Alderman Dorothy Rees (Lab), who was elected for three years to fill a vacancy in 1934, also sought re-election.

== Outcome ==
Labour retained their majority, losing two seats but gaining three.

== Results ==
=== Aberaman ===
Aberaman 1937
Party	Candidate	Votes	%	±%
Labour	Florence Rose Davies**	Unopposed	N/A	N/A
Labour hold				

=== Aberavon ===
Aberavon 1937
Party	Candidate	Votes	%	±%
Labour	Edward Lewis Hare*	Unopposed		
Labour hold		Swing		

=== Abercynon ===
Abercynon 1937
Party	Candidate	Votes	%	±%
Labour	Joseph Dicks**	Unopposed		
Labour hold		Swing		

=== Aberdare Town ===
Aberdare Town 1937
Party	Candidate	Votes	%	±%
Independent	Thomas Alwyn John	1,292		
Labour	Tom Williams	977		
Independent	Henry Cohen	242		
Majority		315		
Independent hold		Swing		

=== Bargoed ===
Bargoed 1937
Party	Candidate	Votes	%	±%
Labour	William John Kedward*	Unopposed		
Labour hold		Swing		

=== Barry ===
Dudley Howe had previously represented Cadoxton and gained the neighbouring Barry ward from Labour. However, Labour won Cadoxton for the first time against the new candidate.

Barry 1937
Party	Candidate	Votes	%	±%
Independent	Dudley Thomas Howe*	2,304		
Labour	W. East*	2,004		
Majority		300		
Independent gain from Labour		Swing		

=== Barry Dock ===
Barry Dock 1937
Party	Candidate	Votes	%	±%
Labour	Dorothy Rees**	1,965		
Independent	G. Edward Smith	1,762		
Majority		203		
Labour hold		Swing		

=== Blaengwawr ===
Blaengwawr 1937
Party	Candidate	Votes	%	±%
Labour	William J. Edwards*	Unopposed		
Labour hold		Swing		

=== Bridgend ===
Bridgend 1937
Party	Candidate	Votes	%	±%
Independent	William W. Phillips*	Unopposed		
Independent hold		Swing		

=== Briton Ferry ===
Briton Ferry 1937
Party	Candidate	Votes	%	±%
Labour	George Gethin*	Unopposed		
Labour hold		Swing		

=== Cadoxton ===
Cadoxton 1937
Party	Candidate	Votes	%	±%
Labour	Digby Smith	1,499		
Independent	A.L. Davies	1,158		
Majority		341		
Labour gain from Independent		Swing		

=== Caerphilly ===
Caerphilly 1937
Party	Candidate	Votes	%	±%
Labour	Evan Phillips*	Unopposed		
Labour hold		Swing		

=== Cilfynydd ===
Cilfynydd 1934
Party	Candidate	Votes	%	±%
Labour	Arthur Pearson*	Unopposed		
Labour hold		Swing		

=== Coedffranc ===
Coedffranc 1937
Party	Candidate	Votes	%	±%
Labour	D.T. Jenkins	2,916		
Independent	Isaac David	1,798		
Majority		1,118		
Labour gain from Independent		Swing		

=== Cowbridge ===
Cowbridge 1937
Party	Candidate	Votes	%	±%
Labour	P. John Smith	Unopposed		
Labour hold		Swing		

=== Cwm Aber ===
Cwm Aber 1937
Party	Candidate	Votes	%	±%
Labour	Rev David M. Jones*	Unopposed		
Majority				
Labour hold		Swing		

=== Cwmavon ===
Cwmavon 1937
Party	Candidate	Votes	%	±%
Labour	John Jones Edwards*	Unopposed		
Labour hold		Swing		

=== Cymmer ===
Cymmer 1937
Party	Candidate	Votes	%	±%
Labour	John James Garwood*	1,167		
Independent	Evan Thomas	485		
Majority		682		
Labour hold		Swing		

=== Dinas Powys ===
Dinas Powys 1937
Party	Candidate	Votes	%	±%
Independent	Ivor Broadbent Thomas*	Unopposed		
Independent hold		Swing		

=== Dulais Valley ===
Dulais Valley 1937
Party	Candidate	Votes	%	±%
Labour	Gwilym Davies*	Unopposed		
Labour hold		Swing		

=== Ferndale ===
Ferndale 1937
Party	Candidate	Votes	%	±%
Labour	Alfred Evans*	Unopposed		
Labour hold		Swing		

=== Gadlys ===
Gadlys 1937
Party	Candidate	Votes	%	±%
Independent	Thomas Phillips*	1,802		
Labour	David Idris Bruton	796		
Majority		1,006		
Independent hold		Swing		

=== Garw Valley ===
Garw Valley 1937
Party	Candidate	Votes	%	±%
Labour	Charles Gunter*	Unopposed		
Labour hold		Swing		

=== Glyncorrwg ===
Glyncorrwg 1937
Party	Candidate	Votes	%	±%
Labour	Sir William Jenkins**	Unopposed		
Labour hold				

=== Gower ===
Gower 1937
Party	Candidate	Votes	%	±%
Independent	Fredrick William Davies	2,083		
Labour	Stanley Jones	1,480		
Majority		603		
Independent hold		Swing		

=== Hengoed ===
Hengoed 1937
Party	Candidate	Votes	%	±%
Labour	Frank Loveday*	Unopposed		
Labour hold		Swing		

=== Hopkinstown ===
Hopkinstown 1937
Party	Candidate	Votes	%	±%
Labour	E.H. Fleming**	Unopposed		
Labour hold		Swing		

=== Kibbor ===
Kibbor 1937
Party	Candidate	Votes	%	±%
Independent	Edgar L. Chappell	1,769		
Independent	John Kane	1,400		
Majority		369		
Independent hold		Swing		

=== Castell Coch ===
Castell Coch 1937
Party	Candidate	Votes	%	±%
Independent	Sir Lewis Lougher*	1,458		
Labour	Edward Harry Follis	606		
Majority		852		
Independent hold		Swing		

=== Llandeilo Talybont ===
Llandeilo Talybont 1937
Party	Candidate	Votes	%	±%
Labour	Caradoc Jones**	Unopposed		
Labour hold		Swing		

=== Llanfabon ===
Llanfabon 1937
Party	Candidate	Votes	%	±%
Labour	William Bowen**	Unopposed		
Labour hold		Swing		

=== Llwydcoed ===
Llwydcoed 1937
Party	Candidate	Votes	%	±%
Independent	Martha Emma Jones*	Unopposed		
Independent hold		Swing		

=== Llwynypia ===
Llwynypia 1937
Party	Candidate	Votes	%	±%
Labour	Philip Haines Rowlands*	Unopposed		
Labour hold		Swing		

=== Loughor ===
Loughor 1937
Party	Candidate	Votes	%	±%
Labour	David John Davies	Unopposed		
Labour hold		Swing		

=== Maesteg, Caerau and Nantyffyllon ===
Maesteg, Caerau and Nantyffyllon 1937
Party	Candidate	Votes	%	±%
Labour	John Evans**	Unopposed		
Labour hold				

=== Maesteg, East and West ===
Maesteg East and West 1937
Party	Candidate	Votes	%	±%
Labour	Tom Jenkins*	Unopposed		
Labour hold		Swing		

=== Mountain Ash ===
The sitting member, the Hon. John Bruce (Ind) stood down and Labour gained the seat without a contest.

Mountain Ash 1937
Party	Candidate	Votes	%	±%
Labour	Justin Lewis	Unopposed		
Labour gain from Independent		Swing		

=== Neath (North) ===
Neath (North) 1937
Party	Candidate	Votes	%	±%
Independent	David Griffith Davies*	1,336		
Labour	J.W. Morgan	1,042		
Majority		294		
Independent hold		Swing		

=== Neath (South) ===
Neath (South) 1937
Party	Candidate	Votes	%	±%
Labour	Charles P. Huins	1,679		
Independent	Col. R.G. Llewellyn	912		
Majority		767		
Labour hold		Swing		

=== Newcastle ===
Newcastle 1937
Party	Candidate	Votes	%	±%
Labour	Rev Horatio R. Protheroe*	Unopposed		
Labour hold		Swing		

=== Ogmore Valley ===
Ogmore Valley 1937
Party	Candidate	Votes	%	±%
Communist	Frederick Arthur Llewellyn*	1,963		
Labour	Stanley James Moore	833		
Majority		1,130		
Communist hold		Swing		

=== Penarth North ===
Penarth North 1937
Party	Candidate	Votes	%	±%
Labour	H.J. Cook	1,001		
Independent	F.R. Cratchley	801		
Majority		200		
Labour gain from Independent		Swing		

=== Penarth South ===
Penarth South 1937
Party	Candidate	Votes	%	±%
Independent	D.B. Jones	Unopposed		
Independent hold		Swing		

=== Pencoed ===
Pencoed 1937
Party	Candidate	Votes	%	±%
Labour	Mervyn W. Paine*	Unopposed		
Labour hold		Swing		

=== Penrhiwceiber ===
Penrhiwceiber 1937
Party	Candidate	Votes	%	±%
Labour	John William Bath*	Unopposed		
Labour hold		Swing		

=== Pentre ===
Pentre 1937
Party	Candidate	Votes	%	±%
Labour	Thomas Tye Andrews*	1,609		
Communist	Abigail Evans	765		
Majority		844		
Labour hold		Swing		

=== Pontardawe ===
Pontardawe 1937
Party	Candidate	Votes	%	±%
Labour	David Daniel Davies**	Unopposed		
Labour hold		Swing		

=== Pontyclun ===
Pontyclun 1937
Party	Candidate	Votes	%	±%
Labour	Johnson Miles*	Unopposed		
Labour hold		Swing		

=== Port Talbot East ===
Port Talbot East 1937
Party	Candidate	Votes	%	±%
Labour	John Thomas**	Unopposed		
Labour hold		Swing		

=== Port Talbot West ===
Port Talbot West 1937
Party	Candidate	Votes	%	±%
Independent	Llewelyn David*	Unopposed		
Independent hold		Swing		

=== Porthcawl ===
Porthcawl 1937
Party	Candidate	Votes	%	±%
Independent	W.A. Howell*	Unopposed		
Independent hold		Swing		

=== Pontlottyn ===
Pontlottyn 1937
Party	Candidate	Votes	%	±%
Labour	W.A. Hancock*	Unopposed		
Labour hold		Swing		

=== Pontypridd Town ===
Pontypridd Town 1937
Party	Candidate	Votes	%	±%
Labour	Jesse Powderhill*	Unopposed		
Labour hold		Swing		

=== Penygraig ===
Penygraig 1937
Party	Candidate	Votes	%	±%
Labour	Thomas Churchill*	2,148		
Independent	William John Gribble	981		
Majority		1,267		
Labour hold		Swing		

=== Porth ===
Porth 1937
Party	Candidate	Votes	%	±%
People's Candidate	Daniel Jones	1,067		
Labour	John Talfryn Llewellyn	1,008		
Majority		59		
Independent hold		Swing		

=== Swansea Valley ===
Swansea Valley 1937
Party	Candidate	Votes	%	±%
Labour	David Jenkins*	Unopposed	N/A	N/A
Labour hold				

=== Tonyrefail and Gilfach Goch ===
Tonyrefail and Gilfach Goch 1937
Party	Candidate	Votes	%	±%
Labour	Thomas Rogers*	1,484		
Communist	David John Griffiths	711		
Independent	Harold Whitton Davies	584		
Independent	Evan Jones	97		
Majority		773		
Labour hold		Swing		

=== Trealaw ===
Trealaw 1937
Party	Candidate	Votes	%	±%
Communist	Lewis Jones	1,945		
Labour	Richard Jones	1,315		
Majority		630		
Communist hold		Swing		

=== Treforest ===
Treforest 1937
Party	Candidate	Votes	%	±%
Independent	Hopkin J. Smith	1,840		
Labour	Arthur James Chick*	1,836		
Majority		4		
Independent gain from Labour		Swing		

=== Treherbert ===
Treherbert 1937
Party	Candidate	Votes	%	±%
Labour	David Edward Williams*	2,856		
Independent	Edwin Jenkins	402		
Majority		2,454		
Labour hold		Swing		

=== Treorchy ===
Treorchy 1937
Party	Candidate	Votes	%	±%
Labour	David Hughes*	Unopposed		
Labour hold		Swing		

=== Tylorstown ===
Tylorstown 1937
Party	Candidate	Votes	%	±%
Labour	David Lewis**	Unopposed		
Labour hold		Swing		

=== Vale of Neath ===
Vale of Neath 1937
Party	Candidate	Votes	%	±%
Labour	William A. Betty*	2,557		
Plaid Cymru	Oliver J. Evans	1,083		
Independent	J.W. Davies	659		
Majority		1,474		
Labour hold		Swing		

=== Ynyshir ===
Ynyshir 1937
Party	Candidate	Votes	%	±%
Labour	Walter Robins	1,192		
People's Candidate	Morgan Benjamin	1,177		
Majority		15		
Labour hold		Swing		

=== Ystalyfera ===
Ystalyfera 1937
Party	Candidate	Votes	%	±%
Labour	Alice Williams*	2,051		
Plaid Cymru	Wynne Samuel	873		
Majority		1,176		
Labour hold		Swing		

=== Ystrad ===
Ystrad 1937
Party	Candidate	Votes	%	±%
Labour	Walter Henry Winter*	1,235		
Communist	Edwin Brinley Roberts	881		
Independent	David Jenkins	871		
Majority		354		
Labour hold		Swing		

== Election of Aldermen ==
In addition to the 66 councillors the council consisted of 22 county aldermen. Aldermen were elected by the council, and served a six-year term. Following the 1937 election, there were eleven Aldermanic vacancies, and the retiring aldermen were all re-elected.

The following retiring aldermen were re-elected:

- William Bowen (Lab, Llanfabon)
- David Daniel Davies (Lab, Pontardawe)
- Rose Davies (Lab, Aberaman)
- John Evans (Lab, Maesteg)
- Johnson Dicks (Lab, Abercynon)
- E.H. Fleming (Lab, Hopkinstown)
- William Jenkins (Lab, Glyncorrwg)
- Caradoc Jones (Lab, Llandeilo Talybont)
- David Lewis (Lab, Tylorstown)
- Dorothy Rees (Lab, Barry Dock)
- John Thomas (Lab, Port Talbot)

== By-elections ==
Eleven vacancies were caused by the election of aldermen.

=== Aberaman by-election ===
Aberaman by-election 1937
Party	Candidate	Votes	%	±%
Labour	Sydney Herbert Stephens*			
Labour hold		Swing		

=== Abercynon by-election ===
Party	Candidate	Votes	%	±%
Labour				
Independent				
Majority				
Labour gain from Independent		Swing		

=== Barry Dock by-election ===
Labour lost the by-election held following the re-election of Dorothy Rees to the aldermanic bench. The Labour candidate had been elected following Rees's original election as alderman three years previously and at the recent election had unsuccessfully contested the neighbouring Barry ward.

Barry Dock by-election 1937
Party	Candidate	Votes	%	±%
Independent	J. Edward Smith	2,080		
Labour	W. East*	1,783		
Majority		297		
Independent gain from Labour		Swing		

=== Glyncorrwg by-election ===
Party	Candidate	Votes	%	±%
Labour				
Independent				
Majority				
Labour gain from Independent		Swing		

=== Hopkinstown by-election ===
Party	Candidate	Votes	%	±%
Labour				
Independent				
Majority				
Labour gain from Independent		Swing		

=== Llandeilo Talybont by-election ===
Llandeilo Talybont
Party	Candidate	Votes	%	±%
Independent	Llewellyn Davies	1,501		
Labour	J. Powell	1,378		
Majority				
Independent gain from Labour		Swing		

=== Llanfabon by-election ===
Llanfabon by-election 1937
Party	Candidate	Votes	%	±%
Labour	Charles Herbert Davies	1,387		
Independent	Rev. Henry Withers	798		
Majority		589		
Labour hold		Swing		

=== Maesteg by-election ===
Party	Candidate	Votes	%	±%
Labour				
Independent				
Majority				
Labour gain from Independent		Swing		

=== Pontardawe by-election ===
Pontardawe by-election 1937
Party	Candidate	Votes	%	±%
Labour	Charles Williams	Unopposed		
Labour hold		Swing		

=== Port Talbot by-election ===
Joe Brown, former agent to Ramsay Macdonald when he was MP for Aberavon, failed to gain the Labour nomination and ran as an Independent.

Port Talbot by-election 1937
Party	Candidate	Votes	%	±%
Labour	Llewellyn Heycock	1,817		
Independent	Joseph A. Brown	1,248		
Majority		569		
Labour hold		Swing		

=== Tylorstown by-election ===
Tylorstown by-election 1937
Party	Candidate	Votes	%	±%
Labour	John Mardy Evans*	1,977		
Communist	George Edward Maslin	584		
Independent	David John	284		
Majority		1,393		
Labour hold		Swing		

== Bibliography ==
- Williams, Chris (1996). Democratic Rhondda: Politics and society 1885-1951. Cardiff: University of Wales Press.
