= 1946 Glamorgan County Council election =

1946 Welsh local government election

The seventeenth election to Glamorgan County Council, south Wales, took place in March 1946. It was preceded by the 1937 election after the 1940 and 1943 elections were postponed due to the Second World War. It was followed by the 1949 election.

== Overview ==
Labour's comfortable majority on the council, including the aldermanic bench, remained unchanged.

== Boundary changes ==
There were no boundary changes at this election.

== Candidates ==
A significant number of Labour candidates were returned unopposed. A number of long-standing members stood down including the Reverend William Saunders, who was not selected as a Labour candidate and Gwilym Davies (Dulais Valley).

There was significant Communist opposition, particularly in the Rhondda where Labour had only narrowly retained the Rhondda West constituency at the previous year's General Election.

In Neath, it was originally reposed that long-serving councillor D.G. Davies, who had been a member of the county council with a few breaks for twenty-five years, would stand again. However, he ultimately stood down.

Nine of the retiring aldermen sought re-election, the exceptions being the Rev William Saunders and Edgar Chappell.

== Outcome ==
Labour retained their majority. In the Rhondda Valley, Labour withstood a Communist challenge This was the first county election for nine years as polling was reported as heavy in a number of wards, including the two contested wards at Pontypridd.

In the Neath area, Labour retained four seats but at Coedffranc the sitting member D.T. Jenkins was defeated by Communist Alun Thomas, a member of the Neath Rural council since 1937.

== Results ==
=== Aberaman ===
Aberaman 1946
Party	Candidate	Votes	%	±%
Labour	Florence Rose Davies**			
Labour hold		Swing		

=== Aberavon ===
Aberavon 1946
Party	Candidate	Votes	%	±%
Labour	Edward Lewis Hare*	Unopposed		
Labour hold		Swing		

=== Abercynon ===
Abercynon 1946
Party	Candidate	Votes	%	±%
Labour	Joseph Dicks**	Unopposed		
Labour hold		Swing		

=== Aberdare Town ===
Aberdare Town 1946
Party	Candidate	Votes	%	±%
Independent	Thomas Alwyn John	1,292		
Labour	Tom Williams	977		
Independent	Henry Cohen	242		
Majority		315		
Independent hold		Swing		

=== Bargoed ===
Bargoed 1946
Party	Candidate	Votes	%	±%
Labour	William John Kedward*	Unopposed		
Labour hold		Swing		

=== Barry ===
Dudley Howe had previously represented Cadoxton and gained the neighbouring Barry ward from Labour. However, Labour won Cadoxton for the first time against the new candidate.

Barry 1946
Party	Candidate	Votes	%	±%
Independent	Dudley Thomas Howe*	2,304		
Labour	W. East*	2,004		
Majority		300		
Independent gain from Labour		Swing		

=== Barry Dock ===
Barry Dock 1946
Party	Candidate	Votes	%	±%
Labour	Dorothy Rees**	1,965		
Independent	G. Edward Smith	1,762		
Majority		203		
Labour hold		Swing		

=== Blaengwawr ===
Blaengwawr 1946
Party	Candidate	Votes	%	±%
Labour	William J. Edwards*	Unopposed		
Labour hold		Swing		

=== Bridgend ===
Bridgend 1946
Party	Candidate	Votes	%	±%
Independent	William W. Phillips*	Unopposed		
Independent hold		Swing		

=== Briton Ferry ===
Briton Ferry 1946
Party	Candidate	Votes	%	±%
Labour	George Gethin*	Unopposed		
Labour hold		Swing		

=== Cadoxton ===
Cadoxton 1946
Party	Candidate	Votes	%	±%
Labour	Digby Smith	1,499		
Independent	A.L. Davies	1,158		
Majority		341		
Labour gain from Independent		Swing		

=== Caerphilly ===
Caerphilly 1946
Party	Candidate	Votes	%	±%
Labour	Evan Phillips*	Unopposed		
Labour hold		Swing		

=== Castell Coch ===
Castell Coch 1946
Party	Candidate	Votes	%	±%
Independent	Sir Lewis Lougher*	1,458		
Labour	Edward Harry Follis	606		
Majority		852		
Independent hold		Swing		

=== Cilfynydd ===
Cilfynydd 1946
Party	Candidate	Votes	%	±%
Labour	W. Edryd Lewis	Unopposed		
Labour hold		Swing		

=== Coedffranc ===
Coedffranc 1946
Party	Candidate	Votes	%	±%
Communist	Alun Thomas	2,055		
Labour	D.T. Jenkins*	1,938		
Independent	Bessie Davies	1,286		
Plaid Cymru	Noah Williams	84		
Majority		117		
Communist gain from Labour		Swing		

=== Cowbridge ===
Cowbridge 1946
Party	Candidate	Votes	%	±%
Labour	P. John Smith	Unopposed		
Labour hold		Swing		

=== Cwm Aber ===
Cwm Aber 1946
Party	Candidate	Votes	%	±%
Labour	Rev David M. Jones*	Unopposed		
Majority				
Labour hold		Swing		

=== Cwmavon ===
Cwmavon 1946
Party	Candidate	Votes	%	±%
Labour	John Jones Edwards*	Unopposed		
Labour hold		Swing		

=== Cymmer ===
Cymmer 1946
Party	Candidate	Votes	%	±%
Labour	John James Garwood*	1,167		
Independent	Evan Thomas	485		
Majority		682		
Labour hold		Swing		

=== Dinas Powys ===
Dinas Powys 1946
Party	Candidate	Votes	%	±%
Independent	Ivor Broadbent Thomas*	Unopposed		
Independent hold		Swing		

=== Dulais Valley ===
Dulais Valley 1946
Party	Candidate	Votes	%	±%
Labour	George Adams	Unopposed		
Labour hold		Swing		

=== Ferndale ===
Ferndale 1946
Party	Candidate	Votes	%	±%
Labour	Alfred Evans*	Unopposed		
Labour hold		Swing		

=== Gadlys ===
Gadlys 1946
Party	Candidate	Votes	%	±%
Independent	Thomas Phillips*	1,802		
Labour	David Idris Bruton	796		
Majority		1,006		
Independent hold		Swing		

=== Garw Valley ===
Garw Valley 1946
Party	Candidate	Votes	%	±%
Labour	Charles Gunter*	Unopposed		
Labour hold		Swing		

=== Glyncorrwg ===
Glyncorrwg 1946
Party	Candidate	Votes	%	±%
Labour	Sir William Jenkins**	Unopposed		
Labour hold				

=== Gower ===
Gower 1946
Party	Candidate	Votes	%	±%
Independent	Fredrick William Davies	2,083		
Labour	Stanley Jones	1,480		
Majority		603		
Independent hold		Swing		

=== Hengoed ===
Hengoed 1946
Party	Candidate	Votes	%	±%
Labour	Thomas Evans**	Unopposed		
Labour hold		Swing		

=== Hopkinstown ===
Hopkinstown 1946
Party	Candidate	Votes	%	±%
Labour	Tom Waite	Unopposed		
Labour hold		Swing		

=== Kibbor ===
Kibbor 1946
Party	Candidate	Votes	%	±%
Independent	Edgar L. Chappell	1,769		
Independent	John Kane	1,400		
Majority		369		
Independent hold		Swing		

=== Llandeilo Talybont ===
Llandeilo Talybont 1946
Party	Candidate	Votes	%	±%
Labour	Caradoc Jones**	Unopposed		
Labour hold		Swing		

=== Llanfabon ===
Llanfabon 1946
Party	Candidate	Votes	%	±%
Labour	William Bowen**	Unopposed		
Labour hold		Swing		

=== Llwydcoed ===
Llwydcoed 1946
Party	Candidate	Votes	%	±%
Independent	Martha Emma Jones*	Unopposed		
Independent hold		Swing		

=== Llwynypia ===
Llwynypia 1946
Party	Candidate	Votes	%	±%
Labour	Philip Haines Rowlands*	Unopposed		
Labour hold		Swing		

=== Loughor ===
Loughor 1946
Party	Candidate	Votes	%	±%
Labour	David John Davies	Unopposed		
Labour hold		Swing		

=== Maesteg, Caerau and Nantyffyllon ===
Maesteg, Caerau and Nantyffyllon 1946
Party	Candidate	Votes	%	±%
Labour	John Evans**	Unopposed		
Labour hold				

=== Maesteg, East and West ===
Maesteg East and West 1946
Party	Candidate	Votes	%	±%
Labour	Tom Jenkins*	Unopposed		
Labour hold		Swing		

=== Mountain Ash ===
The sitting member, the Hon. John Bruce (Ind) stood down and Labour gained the seat without a contest.

Mountain Ash 1946
Party	Candidate	Votes	%	±%
Labour	Justin Lewis	Unopposed		
Labour gain from Independent		Swing		

=== Neath (North) ===
Neath (North) 1946
Party	Candidate	Votes	%	±%
Independent	W.K. Owen	1,445		
Labour	Edgar Owen	991		
Majority		454		
Independent hold		Swing		

=== Neath (South) ===
Neath (South) 1946
Party	Candidate	Votes	%	±%
Labour	Rev W. Degwel Thomas**	1,484		
Independent	Katie Davies	1,035		
Majority		449		
Labour hold		Swing		

=== Newcastle ===
Newcastle 1946
Party	Candidate	Votes	%	±%
Labour	Rev Horatio R. Protheroe*	Unopposed		
Labour hold		Swing		

=== Ogmore Valley ===
Ogmore Valley 1946
Party	Candidate	Votes	%	±%
Communist	Frederick Arthur Llewellyn*	1,963		
Labour	Stanley James Moore	833		
Majority		1,130		
Communist hold		Swing		

=== Penarth North ===
Penarth North 1946
Party	Candidate	Votes	%	±%
Labour	H.J. Cook	1,001		
Independent	F.R. Cratchley	801		
Majority		200		
Labour gain from Independent		Swing		

=== Penarth South ===
Penarth South 1946
Party	Candidate	Votes	%	±%
Independent	D.B. Jones	Unopposed		
Independent hold		Swing		

=== Pencoed ===
Pencoed 1946
Party	Candidate	Votes	%	±%
Labour	Mervyn W. Paine*	Unopposed		
Labour hold		Swing		

=== Penrhiwceiber ===
Penrhiwceiber 1946
Party	Candidate	Votes	%	±%
Labour	John William Bath*	Unopposed		
Labour hold		Swing		

=== Pentre ===
Pentre 1946
Party	Candidate	Votes	%	±%
Independent	Glyn L. Wales	2,530		
Labour	Glyn Evans	978		
Communist	Thomas Evans	414		
Majority		1,552		
Independent gain from Labour		Swing		

=== Penygraig ===
Penygraig 1946
Party	Candidate	Votes	%	±%
Labour	Thomas Churchill*	2,148		
Independent	William John Gribble	981		
Majority		1,267		
Labour hold		Swing		

=== Pontardawe ===
Pontardawe 1946
Party	Candidate	Votes	%	±%
Labour	David Daniel Davies**	Unopposed		
Labour hold		Swing		

=== Pontlottyn ===
Pontlottyn 1946
Party	Candidate	Votes	%	±%
Labour	W.A. Hancock*	Unopposed		
Labour hold		Swing		

=== Pontyclun ===
Pontyclun 1946
Party	Candidate	Votes	%	±%
Labour	Theo Griffiths	Unopposed		
Labour hold		Swing		

=== Pontypridd Town ===
Pontypridd Town 1946
Party	Candidate	Votes	%	±%
Labour	Ivor M. Jenkins	1,458		
Independent	Cyril R. Morgan	1,450		
Majority		8		
Labour hold		Swing		

=== Port Talbot East ===
Port Talbot East 1946
Party	Candidate	Votes	%	±%
Labour	John Thomas**	Unopposed		
Labour hold		Swing		

=== Port Talbot West ===
Port Talbot West 1946
Party	Candidate	Votes	%	±%
Independent	Llewelyn David*	Unopposed		
Independent hold		Swing		

=== Porth ===
Porth 1946
Party	Candidate	Votes	%	±%
Labour	Thomas Griffiths	976		
Independent	Daniel Jones*	974		
Communist	Murray Williams	868		
Majority		2		
Labour gain from Independent		Swing		

=== Porthcawl ===
Porthcawl 1946
Party	Candidate	Votes	%	±%
Independent	W.A. Howell*	Unopposed		
Independent hold		Swing		

=== Swansea Valley ===
Swansea Valley 1946
Party	Candidate	Votes	%	±%
Labour	David Jenkins*			
Labour hold		Swing		

=== Tonyrefail and Gilfach Goch ===
Tonyrefail and Gilfach Goch 1946
Party	Candidate	Votes	%	±%
Labour	Thomas Rogers*	1,484		
Communist	David John Griffiths	711		
Independent	Harold Whitton Davies	584		
Independent	Evan Jones	97		
Majority		773		
Labour hold		Swing		

=== Trealaw ===
Trealaw 1946
Party	Candidate	Votes	%	±%
Communist	Lewis Jones	1,945		
Labour	Richard Jones	1,315		
Majority		630		
Communist hold		Swing		

=== Treforest ===
Treforest 1946
Party	Candidate	Votes	%	±%
Labour	Arthur W. Harris	2,507		
Independent	Ceiriog Williams	1,029		
Majority		1,478		
Labour gain from Independent		Swing		

=== Treherbert ===
Treherbert 1946
Party	Candidate	Votes	%	±%
Labour	William Llewellyn*	3,345		
Communist	George Thomas	1,964		
Majority		1,391		
Labour hold		Swing		

=== Treorchy ===
Treorchy 1946
Party	Candidate	Votes	%	±%
Labour	Rhys Evans**	4,401		
Communist	Ivor Williams	1,077		
Majority		3,324		
Labour hold		Swing		

=== Tylorstown ===
Tylorstown 1946
Party	Candidate	Votes	%	±%
Labour	Llewellyn Jones	1,984		
Communist	Frederick J. Morton	942		
Majority		1,042		
Labour hold		Swing		

=== Vale of Neath ===
Vale of Neath 1946
Party	Candidate	Votes	%	±%
Labour	William A. Betty*	Unopposed		
Labour hold		Swing		

=== Ynyshir ===
Ynyshir 1946
Party	Candidate	Votes	%	±%
Labour	Ivor Jones	1,855		
Independent	Morgan Benjamin	1,418		
Majority		437		
Labour hold		Swing		

=== Ystalyfera ===
Ystalyfera 1946
Party	Candidate	Votes	%	±%
Labour	Alice Williams*	2,051		
Plaid Cymru	Wynne Samuel	873		
Majority		1,176		
Labour hold		Swing		

=== Ystrad ===
Ystrad 1946
Party	Candidate	Votes	%	±%
Labour	Sidney Cadogan**	1,931		
Communist	Annie Powell	1,189		
Independent	Thomas Aldridge	853		
Majority		742		
Labour hold		Swing		

== Election of Aldermen ==
In addition to the 66 councillors the council consisted of 22 county aldermen. Aldermen were elected by the council, and served a six-year term. Following the 1946 election, there were eleven Aldermanic vacancies, all of which all of which were filled by Labour nominees despite the protestations of their opponents. Rhys Evans was the longest serving alderman, having first been elected in 1922.

The following retiring aldermen were re-elected:

- Sidney Cadogan (Lab, Ystrad)
- W.H. Davies (Lab, Gower)
- Alfred Evans (Lab, Ferndale)
- Rhys Evans (Lab, Treorchy)
- Tom Evans (Lab, Pengam)
- Daniel T. Jones (Lab, Ystalyfera)
- W. Arthur Jones (Lab, Tonyrefail)
- Evan Phillips (Lab, Caerphilly)
- Rev W. Degwel Thomas (Lab, Neath)

The following new aldermen were elected:

- H.J. Cook (Lab, Penarth)
- Mervyn Payne (Lab, Pencoed)

== By-elections ==
Eleven vacancies were caused by the election of aldermen. At Neath, Charles P. Huins held his seat with a majority which exceeded that gained by Alderman Degwel Thomas at the triennial election.

=== Aberaman by-election ===
Aberaman by-election 1946
Party	Candidate	Votes	%	±%
Labour	Sydney Herbert Stephens*			
Labour hold		Swing		

=== Neath South by-election ===
Neath South by-election 1946
Party	Candidate	Votes	%	±%
Labour	Charles P. Huins	1,571		
Independent	John Walter Jones	896		
Majority		675		
Labour hold		Swing		

=== Llanfabon by-election ===
Llanfabon by-election 1946
Party	Candidate	Votes	%	±%
Labour	Charles Herbert Davies	1,387		
Independent	Rev. Henry Withers	798		
Majority		589		
Labour hold		Swing		

=== Tylorstown by-election ===
Tylorstown by-election 1947
Party	Candidate	Votes	%	±%
Labour	John Mardy Evans*	1,977		
Communist	George Edward Maslin	584		
Independent	David John	284		
Majority		1,393		
Labour hold		Swing		

== Bibliography ==
- Williams, Chris (1996). Democratic Rhondda: Politics and society 1885-1951. Cardiff: University of Wales Press.
