= Walter Sweeney (politician) =

British politician (born 1949)

Member of Parliament for Vale of Glamorgan
- In office 9 April 1992 – 8 April 1997
- Preceded by: John Smith
- Succeeded by: John Smith

Personal details
- Born: 23 April 1949 (age 76) Dublin, Ireland
- Party: Conservative
- Spouse(s): Nuala Kennan; 3 children
- Profession: Solicitor

Walter Edward Sweeney (born 23 April 1949) is a British politician, formerly a member of the Conservative Party.

== Member of Parliament ==
Sweeney contested Stretford in 1983, but Labour's Tony Lloyd beat him by 4,432 votes.

In 1992, he was elected MP for the Vale of Glamorgan by 19 votes, defeating Labour's John Smith who had won the seat in a 1989 by-election. In the 1997 Labour landslide, however, Sweeney lost the seat back to Smith.

In 2008, Sweeney, a member of the executive committee of The Freedom Association, made a surprise political re-appearance, standing as an Independent against the Conservative candidate in the Haltemprice and Howden by-election.

He stood in the 2012 election for Police and Crime Commissioner for Humberside as an Independent. He finished sixth with 5,118 votes.

== Personal life ==
Sweeney lives in Beverley, Yorkshire with his wife. He has three children.

== Sources ==
- Times Guide to the House of Commons, Times Newspapers Limited, 1997

Parliament of the United Kingdom
| Preceded by John Smith | Member of Parliament for Vale of Glamorgan; 1992 – 1997 | Succeeded by John Smith |
