= Pilton =

Pilton may refer to:

== Places ==
- Pilton, Queensland, Australia
- Pilton, Devon, England
  - Pilton railway station
- Pilton, Northamptonshire, England
- Pilton, Rutland, England
- Pilton, Somerset, England
- Pilton, Edinburgh, Scotland

== People ==
- Barry Pilton (born 1946), British writer
- Simon Pilton (fl. 2009), British songwriter and record producer

== Other uses ==
- Pilton (ship), wrecked in the Bristol Channel in 1924

== See also ==
- Piltdown
