= Cardiff Rural District =

Local government district in Wales

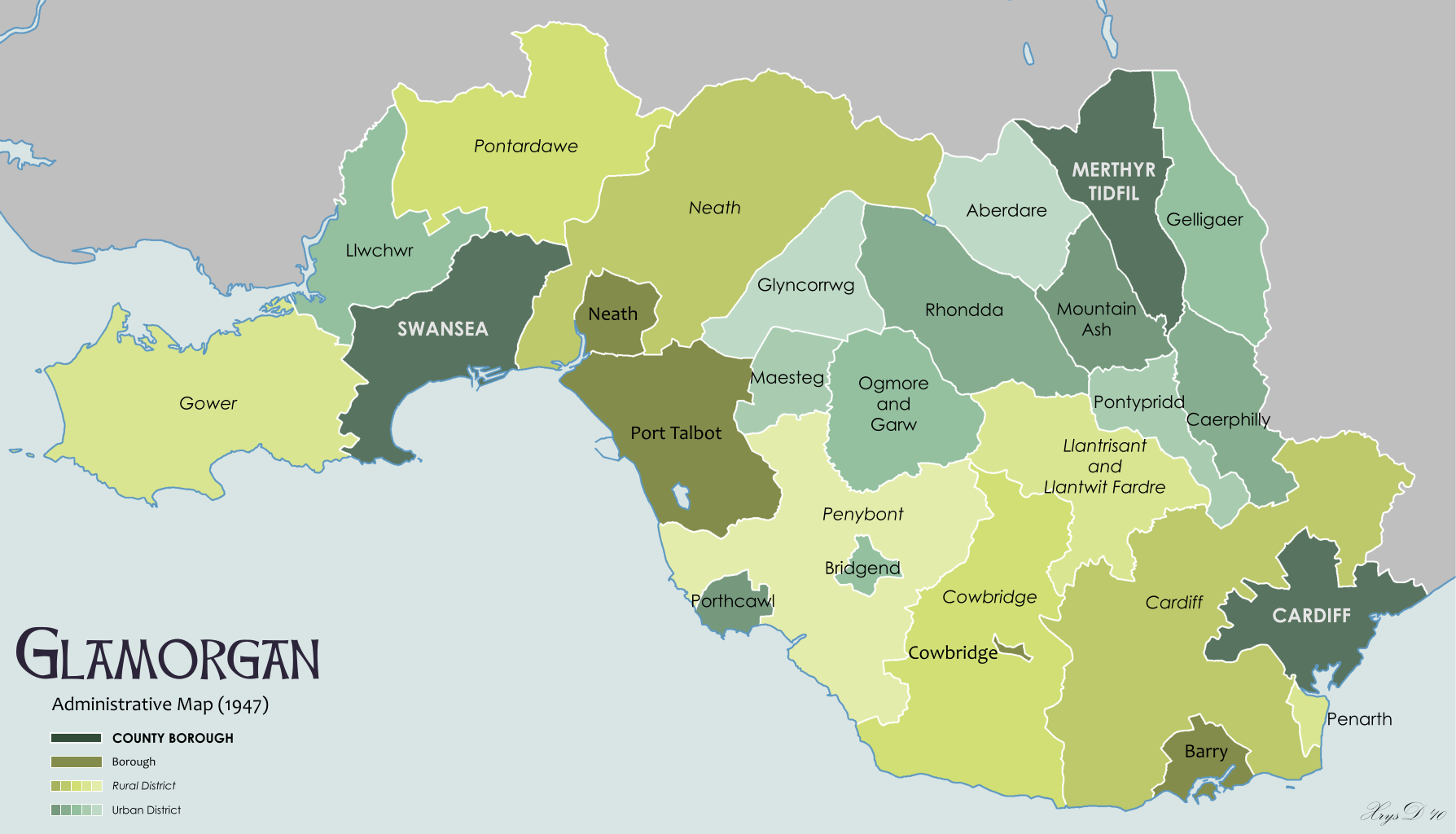
Local government divisions of Glamorgan in 1947 (Cardiff, Swansea and Merthyr Tydfil were separate county boroughs)

Cardiff Rural District was a second tier local government district of Glamorgan, Wales, until 1974. It covered the more rural areas to the west and north of the city of Cardiff.

== Background ==
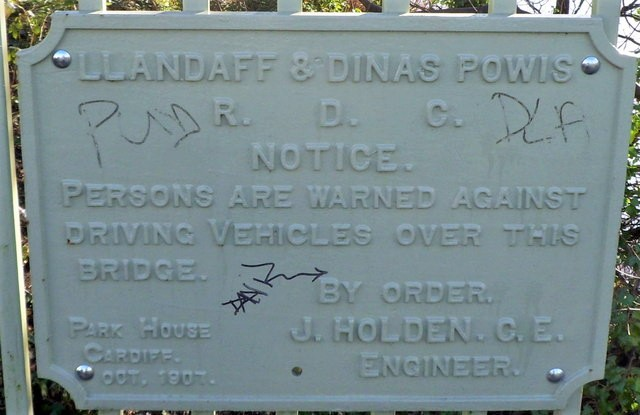
Llandaff and Dinas Powis RDC notice (1907), Taff's Well

Cardiff Rural District was preceded by the Llandaff and Dinas Powis Rural District which had been created in December 1894. In 1922 large parts of the parishes of Caerau, Llandaff, Llanishen, St Fagans, Michaelston-super-Ely, Whitchurch and Llanedeyrn (total population 19,000) were transferred to Cardiff County Borough and the rural district's name was changed to Cardiff Rural District. The rural district excluded Penarth Urban District and the town of Barry.

Following the Cardiff Order 1966 the majority of Whitchurch and parts of Radyr, Lisvane and Llanedeyrn were transferred to Cardiff. Barry MP, Raymond Gower, bemoaned in Parliament that this would reduce Cardiff Rural District's population and ratable value by over 50%. In a 1961 referendum on the issue, the electorate of Rhiwbina had voted by 83% to remain in Cardiff RD, while in Whitchurch it was 91%.

== Cardiff Rural District Council ==
Cardiff Rural District Council was the local authority administering Cardiff Rural District. The council was responsible for sanitation, public health and housing. It later gained the powers of an urban district council, to make bye-laws for developments such as new streets and buildings.

At the council's last full elections on 7 May 1970, contests took place in ten electoral wards – of Llancarfan and Llanfythin, Llanilterne and Creigiau, Pendoylan, Penygarn, Peterson-super-Ely, St Andrews, St Fagans, Sully and Lavernock, Van, Welsh St Donats – electing twelve councillors. Eleven were Independents and one was Conservative.

== Dissolution ==
As a result of the Local Government Act 1972, Cardiff Rural District was abolished and, in 1974, it was divided amongst the new local authority districts of Cardiff, Rhymney Valley, Taff-Ely and Vale of Glamorgan.

== See also ==
- List of rural and urban districts in Wales in 1973
