= 1949 Glamorgan County Council election =

1949 Welsh local government election

The eighteenth election to Glamorgan County Council, south Wales, took place in April 1949. It was preceded by the 1946 election and followed by the 1952 election.

== Overview ==
Labour's comfortable majority on the council, including the aldermanic bench, remained unchanged.

== Boundary changes ==
There were no boundary changes at this election.

== Candidates ==
Many candidates were returned unopposed.

Among the Labour candidates returned unopposed was John Shea (Briton Ferry) who had been selected in a 'referendum' to succeed George Gethin, who had died some months before the election.

== Outcome ==
Labour retained their majority as comfortably as in all previous elections, and captured both the Garw Valley ward and the Coedffranc ward from the Communists.

== Results ==
=== Aberaman ===
Aberaman 1949
Party	Candidate	Votes	%	±%
Labour	Florence Rose Davies**			
Labour hold		Swing		

=== Aberavon ===
Aberavon 1949
Party	Candidate	Votes	%	±%
Labour	Edward Lewis Hare*	Unopposed		
Labour hold		Swing		

=== Abercynon ===
Abercynon 1949
Party	Candidate	Votes	%	±%
Labour	Joseph Dicks**	Unopposed		
Labour hold		Swing		

=== Aberdare Town ===
Aberdare Town 1949
Party	Candidate	Votes	%	±%
Independent	Thomas Alwyn John	1,292		
Labour	Tom Williams	977		
Independent	Henry Cohen	242		
Majority		315		
Independent hold		Swing		

=== Bargoed ===
Bargoed 1949
Party	Candidate	Votes	%	±%
Labour	William John Kedward*	Unopposed		
Labour hold		Swing		

=== Barry ===
Dudley Howe had previously represented Cadoxton and gained the neighbouring Barry ward from Labour. However, Labour won Cadoxton for the first time against the new candidate.

Barry 1949
Party	Candidate	Votes	%	±%
Independent	Dudley Thomas Howe*	2,304		
Labour	W. East*	2,004		
Majority		300		
Independent gain from Labour		Swing		

=== Barry Dock ===
Barry Dock 1949
Party	Candidate	Votes	%	±%
Labour	Dorothy Rees**	1,965		
Independent	G. Edward Smith	1,762		
Majority		203		
Labour hold		Swing		

=== Blaengwawr ===
Blaengwawr 1949
Party	Candidate	Votes	%	±%
Labour	William J. Edwards*	Unopposed		
Labour hold		Swing		

=== Bridgend ===
Bridgend 1949
Party	Candidate	Votes	%	±%
Independent	H.P. Williams	1,808		
Labour	W.T. Ellis	1,344		
Conservative	H.D. Bellew	945		
Majority		464		
Independent hold		Swing		

=== Briton Ferry ===
Briton Ferry 1949
Party	Candidate	Votes	%	±%
Labour	John Shea	Unopposed		
Labour hold		Swing		

=== Cadoxton ===
Cadoxton 1949
Party	Candidate	Votes	%	±%
Labour	Digby Smith	1,499		
Independent	A.L. Davies	1,158		
Majority		341		
Labour gain from Independent		Swing		

=== Caerphilly ===
Caerphilly 1949
Party	Candidate	Votes	%	±%
Labour	Evan Phillips*	Unopposed		
Labour hold		Swing		

=== Castell Coch ===
Castell Coch 1949
Party	Candidate	Votes	%	±%
Independent	Sir Lewis Lougher*	1,458		
Labour	Edward Harry Follis	606		
Majority		852		
Independent hold		Swing		

=== Cilfynydd ===
Cilfynydd 1949
Party	Candidate	Votes	%	±%
Labour	W. Edryd Lewis	Unopposed		
Labour hold		Swing		

=== Coedffranc ===
Coedffranc 1949
Party	Candidate	Votes	%	±%
Labour	D.T. Jenkins	3,278		
Communist	Alun Thomas*	1,456		
Independent	Bessie Davies	908		
Majority		1,822		
Labour gain from Communist		Swing		

=== Cowbridge ===
Cowbridge 1949
Party	Candidate	Votes	%	±%
Labour	D.I. Morgan	2,770		
Independent	D.H. Hopkin	2,410		
Majority		360		
Labour hold		Swing		

=== Cwm Aber ===
Cwm Aber 1949
Party	Candidate	Votes	%	±%
Labour	Rev David M. Jones*	Unopposed		
Majority				
Labour hold		Swing		

=== Cwmavon ===
Cwmavon 1949
Party	Candidate	Votes	%	±%
Labour	John Jones Edwards*	Unopposed		
Labour hold		Swing		

=== Cymmer ===
Cymmer 1949
Party	Candidate	Votes	%	±%
Labour	John James Garwood*	1,167		
Independent	Evan Thomas	485		
Majority		682		
Labour hold		Swing		

=== Dinas Powys ===
Dinas Powys 1949
Party	Candidate	Votes	%	±%
Independent	Ivor Broadbent Thomas*	Unopposed		
Independent hold		Swing		

=== Dulais Valley ===
Dulais Valley 1949
Party	Candidate	Votes	%	±%
Labour	George Adams*	Unopposed		
Labour hold		Swing		

=== Ferndale ===
Ferndale 1934
Party	Candidate	Votes	%	±%
Labour	Alfred Evans*	Unopposed		
Labour hold		Swing		

=== Gadlys ===
Gadlys 1949
Party	Candidate	Votes	%	±%
Independent	Thomas Phillips*	1,802		
Labour	David Idris Bruton	796		
Majority		1,006		
Independent hold		Swing		

=== Garw Valley ===
Garw Valley 1949
Party	Candidate	Votes	%	±%
Labour	Charles Gunter*	Unopposed		
Labour hold		Swing		

=== Glyncorrwg ===
Glyncorrwg 1949
Party	Candidate	Votes	%	±%
Labour	Sir William Jenkins**	Unopposed		
Labour hold		Swing		

=== Gower ===
Gower 1949
Party	Candidate	Votes	%	±%
Independent	Fredrick William Davies	2,083		
Labour	Stanley Jones	1,480		
Majority		603		
Independent hold		Swing		

=== Hengoed ===
Hengoed 1949
Party	Candidate	Votes	%	±%
Labour	Frank Loveday*	Unopposed		
Labour hold		Swing		

=== Hopkinstown ===
Hopkinstown 1949
Party	Candidate	Votes	%	±%
Labour	Tom Waite	Unopposed		
Labour hold		Swing		

=== Kibbor ===
Kibbor 1931
Party	Candidate	Votes	%	±%
Independent	Edgar L. Chappell	1,769		
Independent	John Kane	1,400		
Majority		369		
Independent hold		Swing		

=== Llandeilo Talybont ===
Llandeilo Talybont 1949
Party	Candidate	Votes	%	±%
Labour	Caradoc Jones**	Unopposed		
Labour hold		Swing		

=== Llanfabon ===
Llanfabon 1949
Party	Candidate	Votes	%	±%
Labour	William Bowen**	Unopposed		
Labour hold		Swing		

=== Llwydcoed ===
Llwydcoed 1949
Party	Candidate	Votes	%	±%
Independent	Martha Emma Jones*	Unopposed		
Independent hold		Swing		

=== Llwynypia ===
Llwynypia 1949
Party	Candidate	Votes	%	±%
Labour	Philip Haines Rowlands*	Unopposed		
Labour hold		Swing		

=== Loughor ===
Loughor 1949
Party	Candidate	Votes	%	±%
Labour	David John Davies	Unopposed		
Labour hold		Swing		

=== Maesteg, Caerau and Nantyffyllon ===
Maesteg, Caerau and Nantyffyllon 1949
Party	Candidate	Votes	%	±%
Labour	E.D. Evans*	Unopposed		
Labour hold		Swing		

=== Maesteg, East and West ===
Maesteg East and West 1949
Party	Candidate	Votes	%	±%
Labour	Tom Jenkins*	Unopposed		
Labour hold		Swing		

=== Mountain Ash ===
Mountain Ash 1949
Party	Candidate	Votes	%	±%
Labour	Justin Lewis	Unopposed		
Labour gain from Independent		Swing		

=== Neath (North) ===
Neath (North) 1949
Party	Candidate	Votes	%	±%
Independent	W.K. Owen*	2,072		
Labour	J.W. Morgan	1,462		
Majority		610		
Independent hold		Swing		

=== Neath (South) ===
Neath (South) 1949
Party	Candidate	Votes	%	±%
Labour	Reg Francis*	Unopposed		
Labour hold		Swing		

=== Newcastle ===
Newcastle 1949
Party	Candidate	Votes	%	±%
Labour	Philip Squire*	3,081		
Conservative	W.T. Baker	530		
Majority		2,551		
Labour hold		Swing		

=== Ogmore Valley ===
Ogmore Valley 1949
Party	Candidate	Votes	%	±%
Communist	Frederick Arthur Llewellyn*	1,963		
Labour	Stanley James Moore	833		
Majority		1,130		
Communist hold		Swing		

=== Penarth North ===
Penarth North 1949
Party	Candidate	Votes	%	±%
Labour	H.J. Cook	1,001		
Independent	F.R. Cratchley	801		
Majority		200		
Labour gain from Independent		Swing		

=== Penarth South ===
Penarth South 1949
Party	Candidate	Votes	%	±%
Independent	D.B. Jones	Unopposed		
Independent hold		Swing		

=== Pencoed ===
Pencoed 1949
Party	Candidate	Votes	%	±%
Labour	Mervyn W. Paine*	Unopposed		
Labour hold		Swing		

=== Penrhiwceiber ===
Penrhiwceiber 1949
Party	Candidate	Votes	%	±%
Labour	John William Bath*	Unopposed		
Labour hold		Swing		

=== Pentre ===
Pentre 1949
Party	Candidate	Votes	%	±%
Independent	Glyn L. Wales	2,530		
Labour	Glyn Evans	978		
Communist	Thomas Evans	414		
Majority		1,552		
Independent gain from Labour		Swing		

=== Penygraig ===
Penygraig 1949
Party	Candidate	Votes	%	±%
Labour	Thomas Churchill*	2,148		
Independent	William John Gribble	981		
Majority		1,267		
Labour hold		Swing		

=== Pontardawe ===
Pontardawe 1949
Party	Candidate	Votes	%	±%
Labour	David Daniel Davies**	Unopposed		
Labour hold		Swing		

=== Pontlottyn ===
Pontlottyn 1949
Party	Candidate	Votes	%	±%
Labour	W.A. Hancock*	Unopposed		
Labour hold		Swing		

=== Pontyclun ===
Pontyclun 1949
Party	Candidate	Votes	%	±%
Labour	Johnson Miles**	2,483		
Independent	Annie Mary Russell	1,554		
Majority		929		
Labour hold		Swing		

=== Pontypridd Town ===
Pontypridd Town 1949
Party	Candidate	Votes	%	±%
Labour	Ivor M. Jenkins	1,458		
Independent	Cyril R. Morgan	1,450		
Majority		308		
Labour hold		Swing		

=== Port Talbot East ===
Port Talbot East 1949
Party	Candidate	Votes	%	±%
Labour	John Thomas**	Unopposed		
Labour hold		Swing		

=== Port Talbot West ===
Port Talbot West 1949
Party	Candidate	Votes	%	±%
Labour	Rees L. Matthews	Unopposed		
Labour hold		Swing		

=== Porth ===
Porth 1949
Party	Candidate	Votes	%	±%
Labour	Thomas Griffiths	976		
Independent	Daniel Jones*	974		
Communist	Murray Williams	868		
Majority		2		
Labour gain from Independent		Swing		

=== Porthcawl ===
Porthcawl 1949
Party	Candidate	Votes	%	±%
Labour	Jenkin Francis John*	3,634		
Independent	Bruce Cameron	2,287		
Majority		1,347		
Labour hold		Swing		

=== Swansea Valley ===
Swansea Valley 1949
Party	Candidate	Votes	%	±%
Labour	David Jenkins*			
Labour hold		Swing		

=== Tonyrefail and Gilfach Goch ===
Tonyrefail and Gilfach Goch 1949
Party	Candidate	Votes	%	±%
Labour	Thomas Rogers*	1,484		
Communist	David John Griffiths	711		
Independent	Harold Whitton Davies	584		
Independent	Evan Jones	97		
Majority		773		
Labour hold		Swing		

=== Trealaw ===
Trealaw 1949
Party	Candidate	Votes	%	±%
Communist	Lewis Jones	1,945		
Labour	Richard Jones	1,315		
Majority		630		
Communist hold		Swing		

=== Treforest ===
Treforest 1949
Party	Candidate	Votes	%	±%
Labour	Arthur W. Harris	2,507		
Independent	Ceiriog Williams	1,029		
Majority		1,478		
Labour gain from Independent		Swing		

=== Treherbert ===
Treherbert 1949
Party	Candidate	Votes	%	±%
Labour	William Llewellyn*	3,345		
Communist	George Thomas	1,964		
Majority		1,391		
Labour hold		Swing		

=== Treorchy ===
Treorchy 1949
Party	Candidate	Votes	%	±%
Labour	Rhys Evans**	4,401		
Communist	Ivor Williams	1,077		
Majority		3,324		
Labour hold		Swing		

=== Tylorstown ===
Tylorstown 1949
Party	Candidate	Votes	%	±%
Labour	Llewellyn Jones	1,984		
Communist	Frederick J. Morton	942		
Majority		1,042		
Labour hold		Swing		

=== Vale of Neath ===
Vale of Neath 1949
Party	Candidate	Votes	%	±%
Labour	Frances Handy*	Unopposed		
Labour hold		Swing		

=== Ynyshir ===
Ynyshir 1949
Party	Candidate	Votes	%	±%
Labour	Ivor Jones	1,855		
Independent	Morgan Benjamin	1,418		
Majority		437		
Labour hold		Swing		

=== Ystalyfera ===
Ystalyfera 1949
Party	Candidate	Votes	%	±%
Labour	Alice Williams*	2,051		
Plaid Cymru	Wynne Samuel	873		
Majority		1,176		
Labour hold		Swing		

=== Ystrad ===
Ystrad 1949
Party	Candidate	Votes	%	±%
Labour	Sidney Cadogan**	1,931		
Communist	Annie Powell	1,189		
Independent	Thomas Aldridge	853		
Majority		742		
Labour hold		Swing		

== Election of Aldermen ==
In addition to the 66 councillors the council consisted of 22 county aldermen. Aldermen were elected by the council, and served a six-year term. Following the 1928 election, there were eleven Aldermanic vacancies, all of which all of which were filled by Labour nominees despite the protestations of their opponents.

The following retiring aldermen were re-elected:

- Sidney Cadogan (Lab, Rhondda)
- W.H. Davies (Lab, Gower)
- Alfred Evans (Lab, Rhondda)
- Rhys Evans (Lab, Treorchy)
- Tom Evans (Lab, Pengam)
- Daniel T. Jones (Lab, Ystalyfera)
- W. Arthur Jones (Lab, Tonyrefail)
- Evan Phillips (Lab, Caerphilly)
- Rev W. Degwel Thomas (Lab, Neath)

The following new aldermen were elected:

- H.J. Cook (Lab, Penarth)
- Mervyn Payne (Lab, Pencoed)

== By-elections ==
Eleven vacancies were caused by the election of aldermen.

=== Aberaman by-election ===
Aberaman by-election 1949
Party	Candidate	Votes	%	±%
Labour	Sydney Herbert Stephens*			
Labour hold		Swing		

=== Abercynon by-election ===
Party	Candidate	Votes	%	±%
Labour				
Independent				
Majority				
Labour gain from Independent		Swing		

=== Barry Dock by-election ===
Labour lost the by-election held following the re-election of Dorothy Rees to the aldermanic bench. The Labour candidate had been elected following Rees's original election as alderman three years previously and at the recent election had unsuccessfully contested the neighbouring Barry ward.

Barry Dock by-election 1949
Party	Candidate	Votes	%	±%
Independent	J. Edward Smith	2,080		
Labour	W. East*	1,783		
Majority		297		
Independent gain from Labour		Swing		

=== Glyncorrwg by-election ===
Party	Candidate	Votes	%	±%
Labour				
Independent				
Majority				
Labour gain from Independent		Swing		

=== Hopkinstown by-election ===
Party	Candidate	Votes	%	±%
Labour				
Independent				
Majority				
Labour gain from Independent		Swing		

=== Llandeilo Talybont by-election ===
Llandeilo Talybont
Party	Candidate	Votes	%	±%
Independent	Llewellyn Davies	1,501		
Labour	J. Powell	1,378		
Majority				
Independent gain from Labour		Swing		

=== Llanfabon by-election ===
Llanfabon by-election 1949
Party	Candidate	Votes	%	±%
Labour	Charles Herbert Davies	1,387		
Independent	Rev. Henry Withers	798		
Majority		589		
Labour hold		Swing		

=== Maesteg by-election ===
Party	Candidate	Votes	%	±%
Labour				
Independent				
Majority				
Labour gain from Independent		Swing		

=== Pontardawe by-election ===
Pontardawe by-election 1949
Party	Candidate	Votes	%	±%
Labour	Charles Williams	Unopposed		
Labour hold		Swing		

=== Tylorstown by-election ===
Tylorstown by-election 1947
Party	Candidate	Votes	%	±%
Labour	John Mardy Evans*	1,977		
Communist	George Edward Maslin	584		
Independent	David John	284		
Majority		1,393		
Labour hold		Swing		

== Bibliography ==
- Williams, Chris (1996). Democratic Rhondda: Politics and society 1885-1951. Cardiff: University of Wales Press.
