= John Smith (Welsh politician) =

Welsh Labour Party politician (born 1951)

John William Patrick Smith
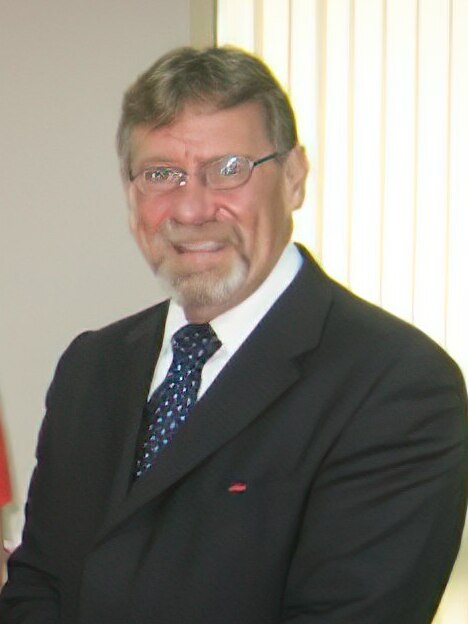

Member of Parliament for Vale of Glamorgan
- In office 1 May 1997 – 12 April 2010
- Preceded by: Walter Sweeney
- Succeeded by: Alun Cairns
- In office 4 May 1989 – 16 March 1992
- Preceded by: Raymond Gower
- Succeeded by: Walter Sweeney

Personal details
- Born: 17 March 1951 (age 75) Penarth, Glamorgan, Wales
- Party: Labour
- Spouse: Kathleen Smith
- Relations: John Smith (Welsh Boxer)
- Children: Melanie Gill, Nathan Smith, Theo Smith.
- Occupation: Retired
- Profession: Politician, activist, campaigner, lecturer, union representative.

John William Patrick Smith (born 17 March 1951) is a Welsh Labour Party politician who was the Member of Parliament (MP) for the Vale of Glamorgan from the 1989 by-election to 1992 and from 1997 to the 2010 general elections.

== Early life ==
Born in Penarth, he attended Fairfield County Primary School in Penarth. Subsequent to him passing the 'Eleven Plus Exam' he attended Penarth County Grammar School (which later became the comprehensive Stanwell School). He served for a while in the Royal Air Force, then worked as a carpenter and joiner for Vale Borough Council from 1971 to 1976. He became a mature student in 1976, studying at the Gwent College of Higher Education, then went to University College of Wales, Cardiff (now Cardiff University) graduating with a BSc in 1981. He was then a university tutor until 1985. From 1985 to 1989, he was a senior lecturer in Business Studies. He became a campaign manager for Gwent Image Partnership, becoming chief executive from 1992 after he lost his seat by only 19 votes.

== Parliamentary career ==
Having contested Vale of Glamorgan at the 1987 general election, he was first elected for the seat in a 1989 by-election, lost it to the Conservatives in 1992 by a very narrow margin, and regained it in 1997. He was re-elected in 2001 and 2005, and served as a member of the Defence Select Committee. He spent much of his time dealing with concerns over the future of RAF St Athan. On the issue of the Iraq War, Smith opposed any form of military action, and was deeply saddened by the parliamentary vote that supported British involvement in the war.

On 22 May 2009, Smith announced that he would stand down at the 2010 general election.

Smith was a Member of the Defence Committee, and Chairman of the Wales Anti-Apartheid Movement (WAAM)

== Personal life ==
Smith came from a working class family, born and raised on a council estate. He married Kathleen Mulvaney (now Kathleen Smith) in 1971 in Liverpool. They have two sons and a daughter, and are now Grandparents.

Parliament of the United Kingdom
Preceded by Sir Raymond Gower	Member of Parliament for Vale of Glamorgan; 1989–1992	Succeeded by Walter Sweeney
Preceded by Walter Sweeney	Member of Parliament for Vale of Glamorgan; 1997–2010	Succeeded by Alun Cairns
