= Lavernock =

Lavernock: Welsh: Larnog
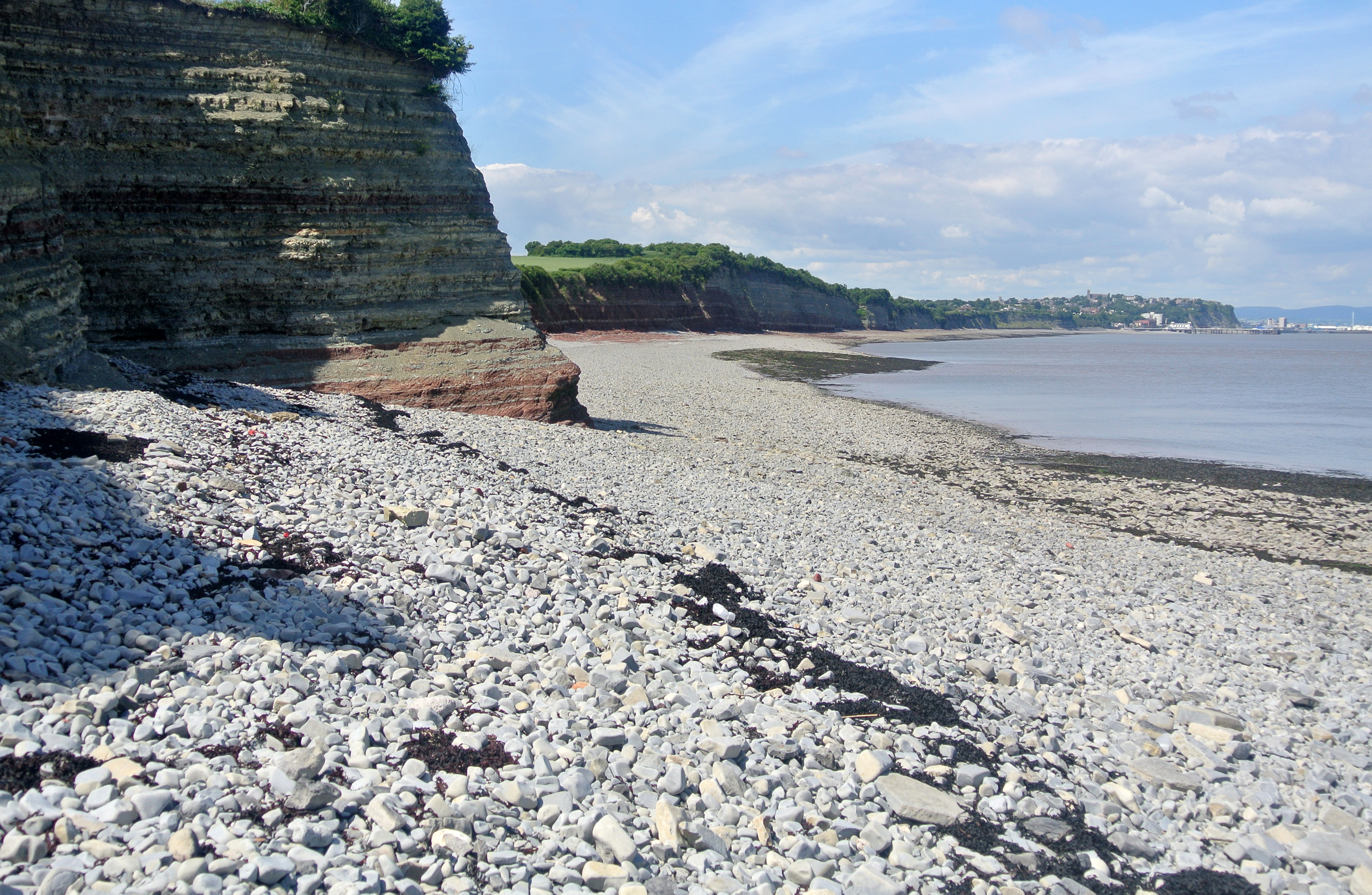
- Lower Blue Lias rocks exposed at Lavernock Point

- Location within the Vale of Glamorgan
- OS grid reference: ST187682
- Community: Sully and Lavernock
- Principal area: Vale of Glamorgan
- Preserved county: South Glamorgan
- Country: Wales
- Sovereign state: United Kingdom
- Postcode district: CF
- Police: South Wales
- Fire: South Wales
- Ambulance: Welsh
- UK Parliament: Cardiff South and Penarth
- Senedd Cymru – Welsh Parliament: Cardiff South and Penarth

Lavernock (Welsh: Larnog) is a hamlet in the Vale of Glamorgan in Wales, lying on the coast 7 miles (11 km) south of Cardiff between Penarth and Sully, and overlooking the Bristol Channel.

== Marconi and the first radio messages across open sea ==
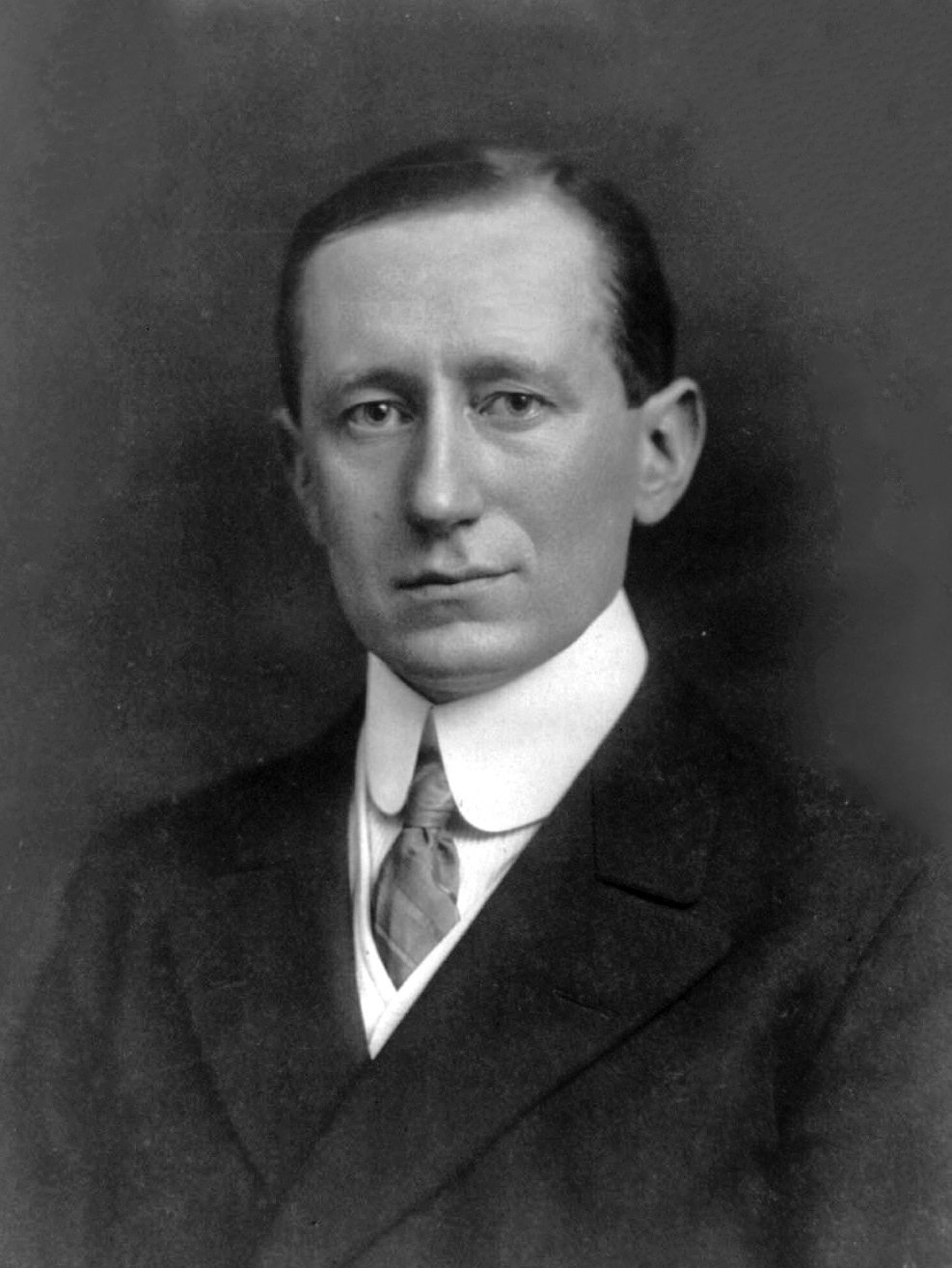
Guglielmo Marconi

Following overland tests at Salisbury Plain during March 1897, on 13 May 1897, the Italian born and recently British based inventor, best known for his development of a radiotelegraph system, Guglielmo Marconi, assisted by George Kemp (who was a Cardiff based Post Office engineer) transmitted and received the first Wireless signals over open sea between Lavernock Point and Flat Holm island.

The very first message transmitted in morse code was "ARE YOU READY". This was immediately followed by "CAN YOU HEAR ME" to which the reply was "YES LOUD AND CLEAR". The morse recording slip for the first message is on display in the National Museum of Wales.

Following the initial opening exchange there followed detailed technical messages in both directions indicating each end's equipment settings and receiving sound levels. Marconi indicated that he was using a 20-inch (510 mm) spark on his equipment.

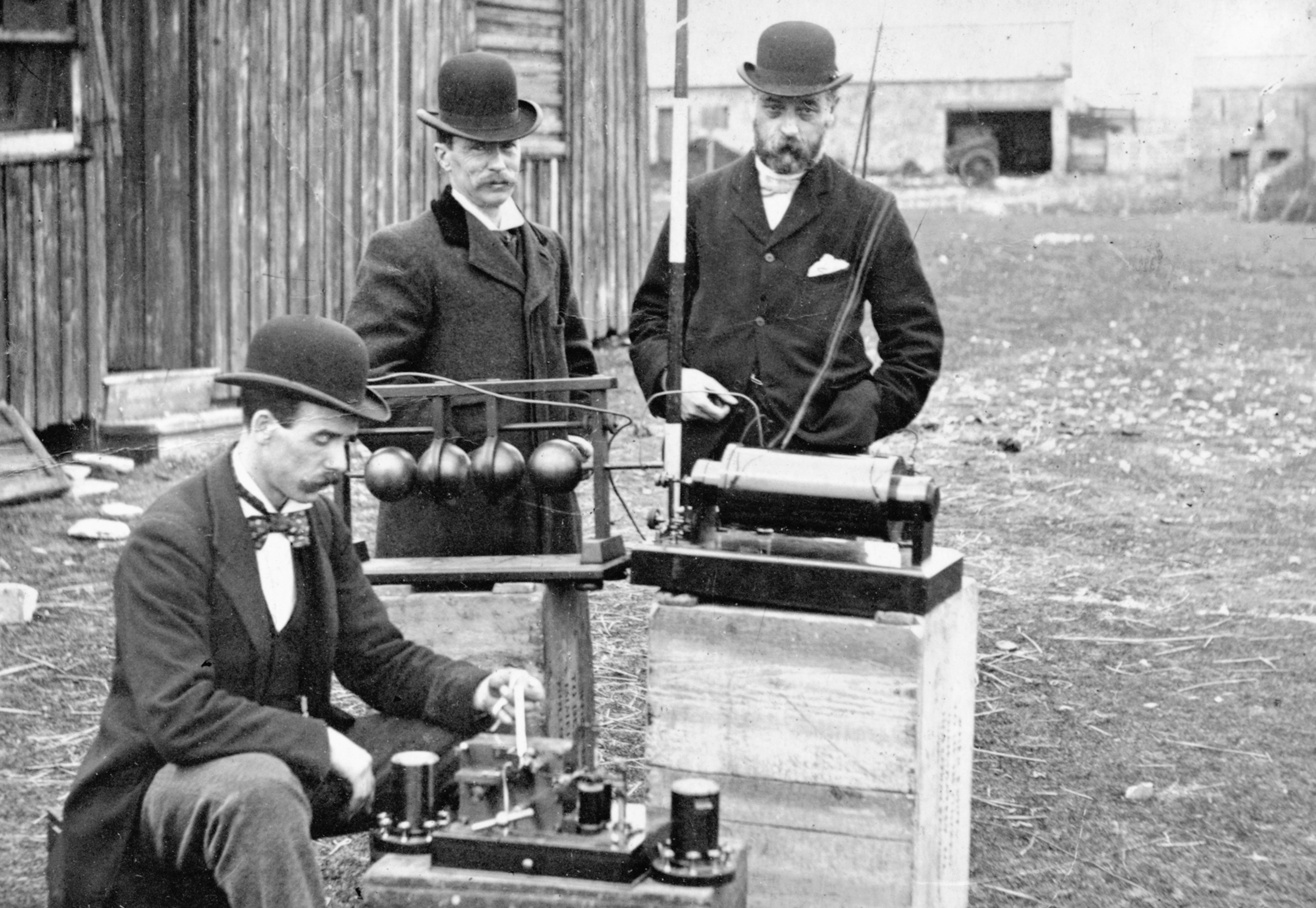
Post office engineers with Marconi's equipment

The successful test followed several days of trials and failure while adjustments were made to aerial length. Extensive trials were carried out over the remainder of the week in various weather conditions and with different settings on the equipment at each end. Marconi benefitted from the active encouragement of then Mr. William Preece (later Sir William Preece) who was Engineer-in-Chief of the Post Office and had himself transmitted radio telegraph morse signals across Coniston Water eight years earlier. Preece had been previously acted as a consultant to the Bristol Corporation's Electricity Department between 1883 and 1893. The Post Office engineers, including George Kemp who kept a detailed diary of these events, had been experimenting for some months at Lavernock Point. Kemp recorded the following in his diary of the experiments:

"Mr Marconi's apparatus was set up on the cliff at Lavernock Point, which is about twenty yards above sea-level. Here we erected a pole, 30 yards (27 m) high, on the top of which was a cylindrical cap of zinc, 2 yards (1.8 m) long and 1-yard (0.91 m) diameter.

Connected with this cap was an insulated copper wire leading to one side of the detector, the other side of which was connected to a wire led down the cliff and dipping into the sea. At Flat Holm Mr Preece's apparatus was arranged, the Ruhmkorff coil also giving 20-inch (510 mm) sparks from an eight-cell battery.

On the 10th May experiments on Mr Preece's electro-magnetic transmission method were repeated, and with perfect success.

The next few days were eventful ones in the history of Mr Marconi. On the 11th and 12th his experiments were unsatisfactory — worse still, they were failures — and the fate of his new system trembled in the balance.

An inspiration saved it. On the 13th May the apparatus was carried down to the beach at the foot of the cliff, and connected by another 20 yards (18 m) of wire to the pole above, thus making an aerial height of 50 yards (46 m) in all. Result, The instruments which for two days failed to record anything intelligible, now rang out the signals clear and unmistakable, and all by the addition of a few yards of wire!"

Marconi's new equipment was therefore used in conjunction with that already adopted by the Post Office. The initial tests were so successful over the three and a third miles (5.4 kilometres) stretch of water that it was quickly decided to relocate the telegraph equipment from Flat Holm to Brean Down Fort, near Weston Super Mare increasing the distance to nearly ten miles (16 kilometres) from the Lavernock Point transmitter.

Following these successful trials, Marconi subsequently vested his new patent rights in his 'Wireless Telegraph and Signal Company', which unfortunately prevented any further co-operation with the Post Office engineers. However, George Kemp immediately resigned from his Post Office position and joined Marconi's new company as head of engineering development.

In 1948, to mark the 50th anniversary of the experiments, a bronze plaque was unveiled by the Cardiff Rotary Club inside the courtyard of the recently closed church of St.Lawrence, Lavernock, commemorating the historic radio transmissions over nine miles (14 km) of open sea. The small stone hut that Marconi used to contain his experimental radio telegraph equipment still stands on the cliff edge at the end of the lane near Lower Cosmeston farmhouse.

== The bays of Lavernock ==
From the late 1890s until 1968 Lavernock and the nearby bays of St Mary's Well and Swanbridge (with its low tide walk out to Sully Island) were popular and busy holiday locations for regular day trippers from the South Wales Valleys, Newport, Cardiff, Penarth and Barry and the beaches were packed with visitors on most weekends and Bank Holidays throughout the summer. The hundreds and sometimes thousands of holidaymakers were served refreshments by an ice cream parlour, two busy cafes, the Golden Hind public house and the three star Lavernock Bay Hotel. Very few visitors arrived by car until the 1960s with the majority travelling by the half-hourly steam trains that stopped at Lavernock and Swanbridge Halts on the busy Taff Vale Railway Line en route to Barry Island.

Lavernock started settling back to quiet seclusion in the late 1960s when the railway line closed down under the Beeching Axe. Some modern day trippers arrived by car, to the degree that the lanes and the Swanbridge car park were often jammed, but visitor numbers had dropped off to such a degree that falling profit margins meant all the food outlets, the Golden Hind pub and eventually even the Bay Hotel closed down and the decline was accelerated even further.

== Lavernock Point ==
Lavernock Point (Welsh: Trwyn Larnog) is a headland on the South Wales coast, overlooking the Bristol Channel with views across to the Somerset Coast. Because of the extreme tidal range there are very strong currents or rips close inshore to the point with speeds that exceed 7 knots (13 km/h; 8.1 mph) for several hours at each tide.

Some sources treat Lavernock Point as the boundary between the Severn Estuary and the Bristol Channel, although definitions of these areas are varied and often ambiguous. It is used as the boundary between Marine Character Areas 28 and 29, named Bristol Channel and Severn Estuary, and the Living Levels Partnership use a definition of Severn Estuary that draws the line between Lavernock Point and Sand Point, marked by Steep Holm and Flat Holm islands.

Various proposals have been put forward to construct a Severn Barrage for tidal electricity production from Lavernock Point to Brean Down in Somerset and the provision remains under discussion by the various agencies.

=== Geology ===
The coastal cliffs which stretch to the north and east of Lavernock Point expose a sequence of sedimentary rocks of late Triassic and early Jurassic age. The strata are assigned to the Penarth and Lias groups and record the inundation of a former desert area by the sea around 200 million years ago. Within the Blue Lias, geologists recognise a St Mary's Well Bay Formation comprising interbedded mudstone and limestone and an overlying Lavernock Shales Formation which is a mudstone with some limestone nodules, both named from this locality, though also found elsewhere. Fossils of oysters and other species are abundant in these cliffs.

In 2015 Nick and Rob Hanigan discovered a fossilised skeleton belonged to a dog-sized creature, a theropod dinosaur, and a "cousin of the giant tyrannosaurus rex". Now named Dracoraptor hanigan meaning "dragon robber", the latter name in honour of the brothers, it was described as "the best dinosaur fossil Wales has ever had" by Steven Vidovic, a palaeontologist at Portsmouth University. The skeleton is now on display at the National Museum Wales in Cardiff.

=== Lavernock Fort ===
Lavernock Battery today

On the point in the late 1860s Lavernock Fort gun battery was built by the Royal Commission. It was completed in 1870, with three 7" muzzle loading cannons to protect the channel approaches to Cardiff and Bristol shipyards. Sometime before 1895 the gun battery was reinforced with a fourth cannon, only for all four guns then to be replaced eight years later by two rapid fire six inch (152 mm) former naval guns in 1903.

A two unit searchlight battery was added during the Second World War. The World War II gun emplacements formed part of the Fixed Defences, Severn Scheme and protected the Atlantic shipping convoy de-grouping zone between Cardiff, Barry and Flat Holm. Today the remaining main section of the gun battery has been listed as an Ancient Monument, which includes the gun emplacements, director-rangefinder observation position, crew and officers quarters. The structure is still commemorated through Lavernock Point's main access road being named 'Fort Road'.

=== Royal Observer Corps ===
A few yards away from the historic Marconi hut Penarth's only World War II Royal Observer Corps (ROC) Searchlight post stood on the cliff edge with its clear views over the Bristol Channel and the islands of Steep Holm and Flat Holm. The Observer Corps site was established by the Air Ministry on part of the original War Department land connected to the Lavernock Gun Battery. The volunteer ROC observers spotted many Nazi German Luftwaffe raids approaching across the channel and activated the air raid warnings in the town.

In early 1962 a protected nuclear fallout shelter (or bunker) was completed at Penarth Clifftop for the ROC (OS Grid Ref: ST 1858 6903), who by the 1960s had switched from above ground aircraft spotting to underground operations with instruments to detect nuclear explosions and warn the public of approaching radioactive fallout in the event of nuclear war. The post members were mobilised later that year and volunteers spent nearly ten days underground during the Cuban Missile Crisis as the government prepared the country for potential outbreak of war.

The Penarth cliff top nuclear bunker was closed down and abandoned by the ROC in 1975 after repeated destructive break-ins by local vandals, but the concrete entrance hatch and ventilator tower can still be observed next to the cliff walk near Lower Cosmeston farmhouse. The Royal Observer Corps itself was disbanded in December 1995 after the end of the Cold War and as a result of recommendations in the governments Options for Change review of UK defence.

=== Nature reserve ===
Lavernock Point is established as a nature reserve where wildlife interest is combined with historical interests in a dramatic coastal reserve. The unimproved limestone grassland supports varied and colourful plants such as dyer's greenweed, devil's-bit scabious, common spotted orchid and fleabane. Butterflies have been observed and recorded by the reserve's warden for over twenty years and more than twenty five species have been identified.

Lavernock and the nearby Cosmeston Lakes continue to be an important landing point for migrating birds. Many bird migration routes across the Bristol Channel cross the reserve, and Steep Holm and Flat Holm islands act as staging posts. Bird sightings vary through the year, with visiting summer migrants, seabirds off the coast and resident breeding birds.

The reserve is managed by the Wildlife Trust of South & West Wales who state that their aims are "To create and maintain the ideal balance between grassland, scrubland and woodland at Lavernock Point Reserve."

== Monkstone Lighthouse ==
Monkstone Lighthouse
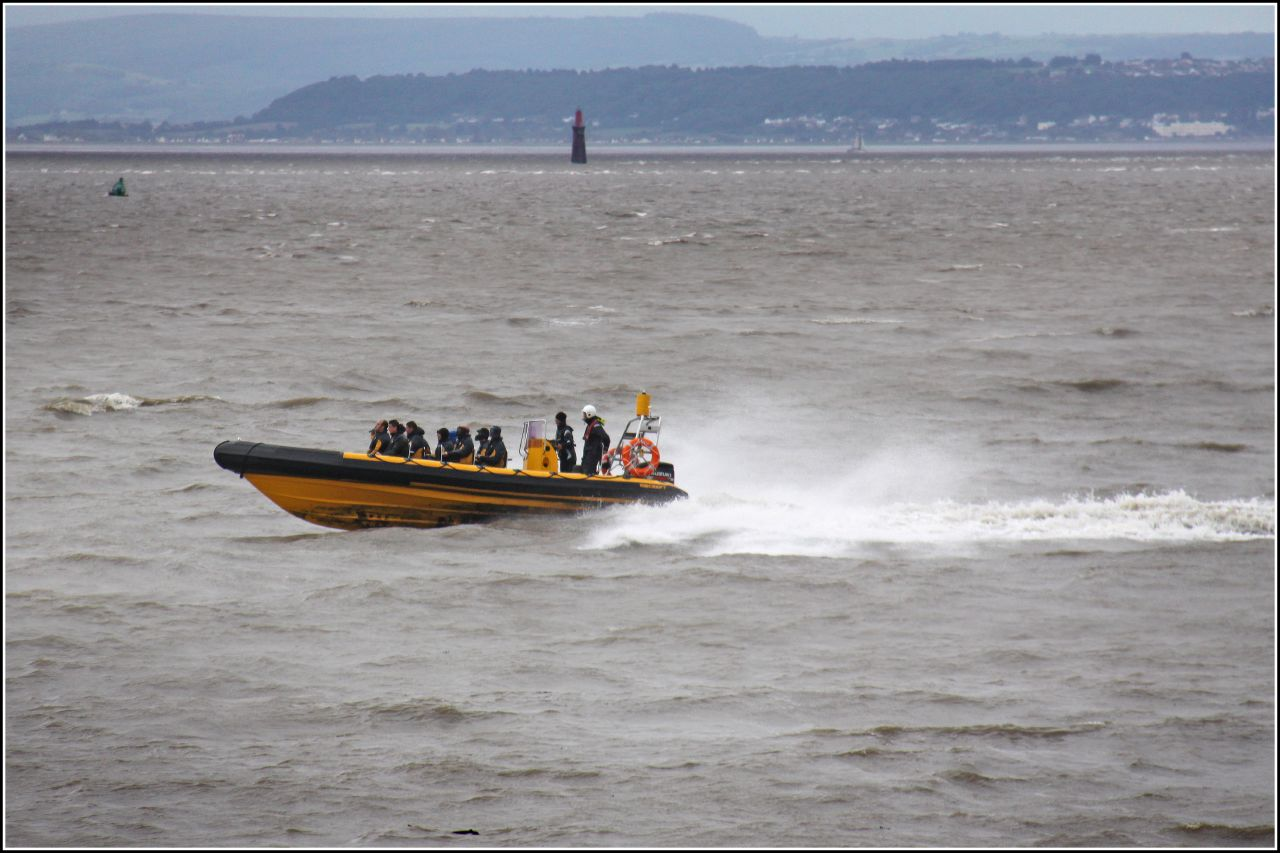
- Monkstone Light in 2012
- Location: Lavernock; Bristol Channel; Wales; United Kingdom
- Coordinates: 51°24′53″N 3°6′0″W

Tower
- Constructed: 1839 (first)
- Construction: stone tower first-stage, fiberglass tower second-stage
- Automated: 1993
- Height: 23 m (75 ft)
- Shape: two-stages cylindrical tower with double balcony and small lantern
- Markings: black lower stage tower, red upper stage tower
- Power source: solar power
- Operator: Trinity House

Light
- First lit: 1993 (current)
- Focal height: 13 m (43 ft)
- Intensity: 3,976 candela
- Range: 12 nmi (22 km)
- Characteristic: Fl W 5s.

Monkstone Lighthouse is located in the Bristol Channel about 3 miles (4.8 km) east of Lavernock Point. A lighthouse here was established in 1839, but the original iron upper structure was replaced in 1993. The current lighthouse, which is solar powered and operated by Trinity House, comprises the original masonry tower strengthened by vertical and horizontal wrought iron bands, with a red glass reinforced plastic tower on top.

== Lavernock today ==
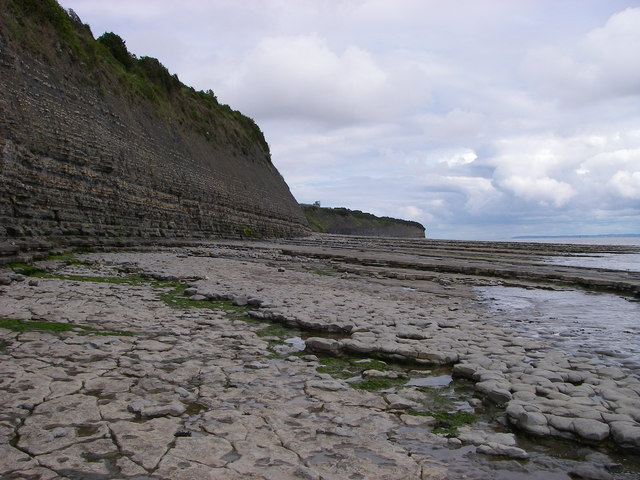
The geology-rich strata of Lavernock cliffs

Lavernock railway station was sold off but long sections of the old railway track bed are still open, from the Fort Road bridge as far as Lower Penarth. It is essentially now a rural greenway and cyclepath. However the track bed in the direction of Sully is either overgrown and impassable and some of it has been sold into private ownership.

Lavernock, St Mary's Well Bay and Swanbridge (Sully Island) can still be reached along the clifftop path from Penarth.

The old cafe car park at Swanbridge was developed as part of the newly opened Captain's Wife public house in the mid-1970s.

The Marconi Holiday Village near Lavernock Point, is run by the Lavernock Point Holiday Park and consists of chalets, fixed caravans and touring berths. The licensed Marconi Club at the holiday village is open to non-residents.

The small parish church of St. Lawrence is a Grade II listed building with medieval, possibly 12th-century, origins. It closed in 2008 and the building is currently being restored and maintained by a volunteer group, consisting of friends of the church. The group has established a charitable trust intended to maintain the structure, allowing continued access to and enjoyment of the historic building. Church services are still currently held along with occasional public open days.

== Local attractions ==
- Cosmeston Lakes Country Park — (water birds, information centre and ice cream kiosk, lakeside and arboreal walks, plus the reconstructed 'living museum at Cosmeston Medieval Village)
- Lavernock Point Nature Reserve and Gun Battery Ancient Monument
- St. Mary's Well Bay
- Coastal and cliff top walks with views of Flat Holm and Steep Holm islands
- Swanbridge and Sully Island — historic haunt of Romans, Vikings, Pirates and smugglers
- Two miles west of Lavernock, is The Bendricks that has the only known upper Triassic dinosaur footprint, possibly by a Tetrasauropus, in Britain

== See also ==
- List of lighthouses in Wales
