= Sully Island =

Small tidal island off the northern coast of the Bristol Channel near Cardiff

Coordinates: 51.395°N 3.19725°W

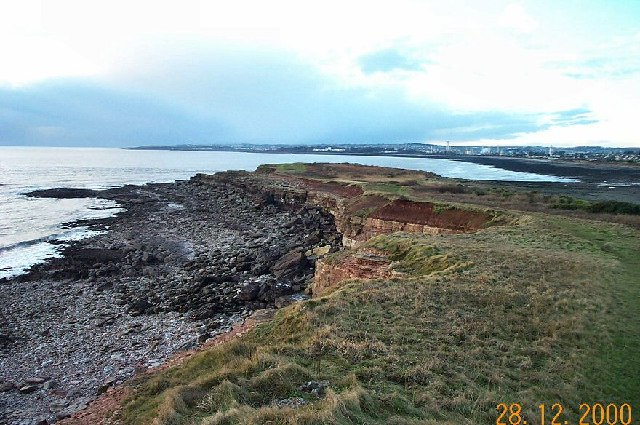
Sully Island from the west end

Sully Island (Welsh: Ynys Sili) is a small tidal island of 14.5 acres (5.9 ha) by the hamlet of Swanbridge in the Vale of Glamorgan, Wales. It is located 400 m (440 yd) off the northern coast of the Bristol Channel, midway between the towns of Penarth and Barry and 10 km (6 mi) south of the Welsh capital city of Cardiff. It is part of the parish of Sully, after which it is named, and is registered as a Site of Special Scientific Interest. Sully island is one of 43 unbridged tidal islands that can be reached on foot from the mainland of Great Britain.

Access to the island is on foot at low tide from the car park of the Captain's Wife pub. A rocky causeway connecting the island to the mainland is uncovered for approximately 3 hours either side of low tide, the island being cut off from the mainland for the rest of the day. A tide table is displayed to indicate when it is safe to cross.

During the 13th century, the island was the base for Alfredo de Marisco, a Norman pirate known locally as the Night Hawk. In the Middle Ages the island was well known for its involvement in the local smuggling trade.

== History ==
=== Origins ===
There is evidence that the island was frequently visited by both Romans and Vikings. There is also archaeological evidence for remains of a Saxon multivallate promontory fort occupying the eastern end of the Island, on the summit of which is a Bronze Age barrow. It has been suggested by some that this was an armed stronghold, but it was more likely to have been a defended residence and farm homestead.

=== Port of Swanbridge ===
Swanbridge and the waterfront protected by Sully Island had been used as a commercial harbour and port for several hundred years, although there is no sign of this today. Cargo arrived and departed via the St Mary's Well Bay Road, which is now blocked off to through traffic, en route for the traditional market at Canton Cross in Cardiff. As late as the early 1970s, the harbour's iron mooring rings could still be seen at the eastern end of the bay.

During the 16th century several historical records show that the trader masters were supposed to pay an import duty to local officials, but many attempted to avoid the payments by smuggling the cargoes ashore. In 1569 court records show that the harbour official seized contraband consisting of 28,000 lb (13,000 kg) of cheese and eighty barrels of butter arriving illegally at Swanbridge. In 1658 the harbour was being used as a landing place for illegal immigrants, described at the time as "undesirables".

A small fleet of fishing vessels were located at Swanbridge harbour and it is likely that the row of cottages, that were converted during 1976 and 1977 into the Captain's Wife pub, were the traditional homes of the local fishermen and their families.

==== SY Scotia ====
Owing to the tricky tides and narrow access, many ships have sunk in the vicinity of the island. Several sources record that the famous Antarctic survey vessel, the SY Scotia, was wrecked on the island during 18 January 1916. Local children from as far away as Barry went to Swanbridge with sacks to collect coal spilled on the foreshore from the wreck, over several weeks. There is a skeleton of a wreck still visible on the island's north foreshore facing Swanbridge, but this vessel's keel is too short to have been the Scotia.

=== 20th century ===
From 1890 until the end of the 1960s, Swanbridge was connected northward to Penarth and Cardiff and westward to Barry and the South Wales Valleys by an extension of the Taff Vale Railway line. The coastal spur was closed under the Beeching cuts in 1968. Swanbridge railway station near the main Lavernock Road junction was closed and is now overgrown with weeds and brambles. The redundant rail track bed has mostly been sold into private ownership and built on, with any unsold stretches being overgrown and impassable as far as the Fort Road bridge at Lavernock. Between Lavernock and Penarth the track bed is a rural greenway and cycle track.

When the rail link arrived at the start of the 20th century, the bays of Swanbridge, St Mary's Well and Lavernock became popular summer time destination for day trippers from Cardiff, Penarth and the South Wales Valleys, particularly at weekends and on bank holidays. For nearly a hundred years there was a busy and profitable cafe and ice cream parlour, located at the St Mary's Well Bay end of the Swanbridge carpark, that was closed and demolished around 1970 when the through road was blocked off to traffic.

Watercolour artist Thomas Frederick Worrall, who lived in Barry from 1913, painted many views of the island.

== Flora and fauna ==
The noted British biologist Brian J. Ford used to live and write at Swanbridge and explored Sully Island frequently. He also carried out extensive ecological studies, while surveying and mapping both the island and the foreshore. Ford recorded many plants unusual for the area, including the bee orchid, the marine spleenwort and the adder's tongue fern.

The island once supported a vast colony of rabbits. When the disease myxomatosis arrived in Britain during 1953, the mainland population of rabbits was quickly decimated. Mostly because of its remoteness from the mainland the Sully Island, rabbits survived for many years until the disease finally arrived on the island, some suspect through human agency. From time to time new rabbit colonies set up home on Sully Island, but at nowhere near the early 1950s levels.

The waters around Sully Island are fished for species such as cod, whiting, pouting, dogfish, conger eel and bass.

Any trees that grew on the island have been long cut down and even scrubby bushes struggle to gain a foothold on the sandy and loamy surface. Most of the island is covered with a coarse grass. A damp central depression on the island supports a reed bed about 0.5 ha (1.2 acres) in extent.

== Geology ==
The sea cliff exposures of Sully Island provide an excellent insight into the environment of the area in Triassic times, approximately 200 million years ago. Red mudstones, sandstones and breccias (rocks made from angular pebbles) indicate that this area was a beach situated on the margin between steep semi-desert land and a large shallow lake or marine lagoon. These Triassic rocks were deposited on top of much older Carboniferous Limestone which can be seen at the base of the cliffs.

== Recent history ==
In 1985 the Vale of Glamorgan Council refused an application for outline planning permission for a Health and Holiday Hydro facility on Sully Island.

In July 2011, the island was marketed for sale by a firm of local chartered surveyors, Cooke & Arkwright. The island was advertised as comprising 14.5 acres (59,000 m^{2}). An initial guide price of £1.25 million was reduced to just £95,000, due to lack of interest. A grassroots campaign, "Save Sully Island", attempted to raise the purchase price but failed. However, a mystery buyer stepped in at the last minute with a bid well in excess of the guide price. The buyer, a sailor, had contributed to the grassroots campaign, and promised to keep the island open to the public.

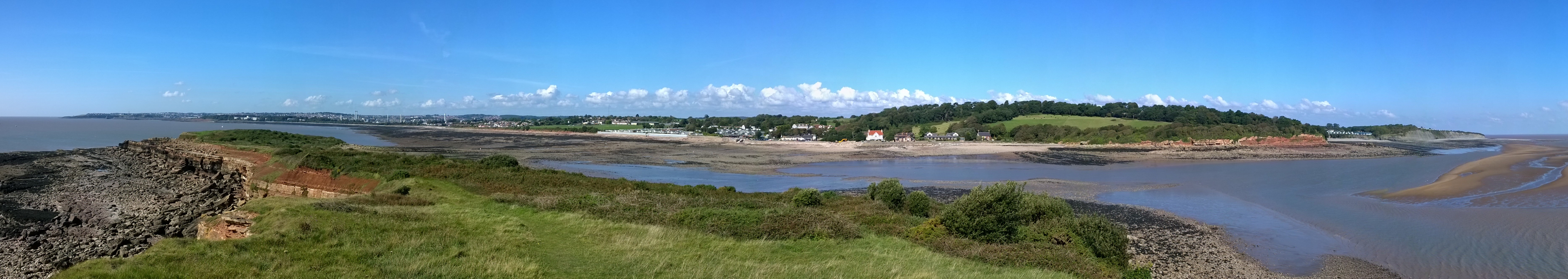
Sully Island (foreground) with Swanbridge on the horizon
