= The Captain's Wife =

Public house in Sully, Vale of Glamorgan, Wales

Coordinates: 51°24′0″N 3°11′53″W

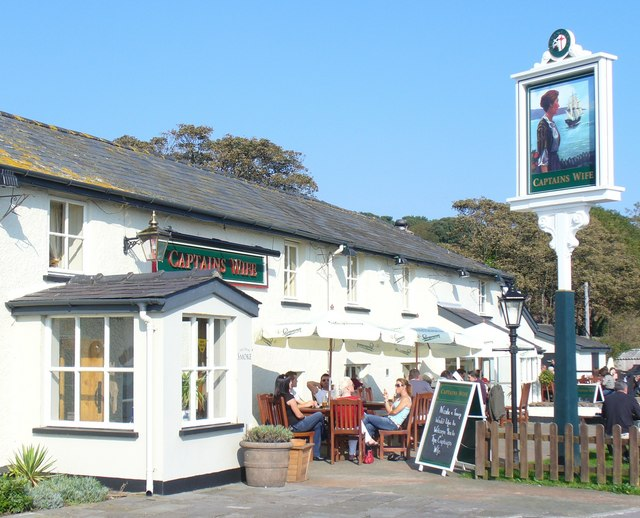
The Captain's Wife

The Captain's Wife is a public house in the former fishing hamlet of Swanbridge in Sully, between Barry and Penarth, Vale of Glamorgan, south Wales. The pub was established in 1977 from a row of three sea houses. Notable smuggling operations and dove culling once took place here and a tunnel connected the sea to what was known as Sully House. It takes its name from the wife of a sea captain who lived here and buried her in a nearby wood rather than confessing to her dying aboard his ship. The body of the wife, named Gertrude, was originally kept in a box that was mistaken for treasure and stolen.

In 1984 the pub owners were given permission to strengthen the sea wall, though the work left concrete and metal debris over the beach which was not cleared until 2012.

In 2002 the owners of the pub imposed parking charges for people coming to the pub and beach. By January 2003, the scheme had been dropped.

In November 2019 the pub's owners were criticised for closing up a historic dovecote. The pub reversed their decision after a social media post by Caerphilly Bird Rescue went viral.

Today the Spinney Park Holiday and Leisure Park surrounds the pub.
