= Barry (UK Parliament constituency) =

UK Parliament constituency (1950–1983)

- Former county constituency for the House of Commons

1950–1983
- Seats: one
- Created from: Llandaff and Barry
- Replaced by: Cardiff South & Penarth and Vale of Glamorgan

Barry was a parliamentary constituency in Glamorgan (later South Glamorgan), Wales which returned one Member of Parliament (MP) to the House of Commons of the Parliament of the United Kingdom, elected by the first past the post voting system.

The constituency was created for the 1950 general election, and abolished for the 1983 general election. The majority of the electorate (61%) passed to the new Vale of Glamorgan constituency where they formed a majority (76.8%) of this seat. The district of Penarth which formed 23.6% of the constituency joined the majority of the Cardiff SE seat to form the new Cardiff South and Penarth.

== Boundaries ==
1950–1955: The Borough of Barry, and the Rural District of Cardiff.

1955–1974: The Borough of Barry, and the Rural District of Cardiff except the parts of the parishes of Lisvane and Radyr added to the County Borough of Cardiff by the Cardiff Extension Act 1950.

1974–1983: The Borough of Barry, the Urban District of Penarth, and the Rural District of Cardiff except the parish of Van.

== Members of Parliament ==
Event	Member	Party
1950	Dorothy Rees	Labour
1951	Sir Raymond Gower	Conservative
1983	constituency abolished	

== Elections ==
=== Elections in the 1950s ===
General election 1950: Barry
Party	Candidate	Votes	%	±%
Labour	Dorothy Rees	20,770	44.5	N/A
Conservative	M Evans	19,745	42.3	N/A
Liberal	John Emlyn-Jones	6,180	13.2	N/A
Majority		1,025	2.2	N/A
Turnout		46,695	86.0	N/A
Registered electors		54,298		
Labour win (new seat)				

General election 1951: Barry
Party	Candidate	Votes	%	±%
Conservative	Raymond Gower	24,715	51.7	+9.4
Labour	Dorothy Rees	23,066	48.3	+3.8
Majority		1,649	3.4	N/A
Turnout		47,781	86.8	+0.8
Registered electors		55,022		
Conservative gain from Labour		Swing		

General election 1955: Barry
Party	Candidate	Votes	%	±%
Conservative	Raymond Gower	27,085	57.9	+6.2
Labour	Dan Jones	19,722	42.1	−6.2
Majority		7,363	15.8	+12.4
Turnout		46,807	83.6	−3.2
Registered electors		56,003		
Conservative hold		Swing		

General election 1959: Barry
Party	Candidate	Votes	%	±%
Conservative	Raymond Gower	30,313	59.3	+1.4
Labour	Dengar Evans	20,790	40.7	−1.4
Majority		9,523	18.6	+2.8
Turnout		51,103	84.9	+1.3
Registered electors		60,206		
Conservative hold		Swing		

=== Elections in the 1960s ===
General election 1964: Barry
Party	Candidate	Votes	%	±%
Conservative	Raymond Gower	28,600	54.0	−5.3
Labour	David Marquand	24,334	46.0	+5.3
Majority		4,266	8.0	−10.6
Turnout		52,934	82.3	−2.6
Registered electors		64,319		
Conservative hold		Swing		

General election 1966: Barry
Party	Candidate	Votes	%	±%
Conservative	Raymond Gower	27,957	51.3	−2.7
Labour	Jeffrey Thomas	26,563	48.7	+2.7
Majority		1,394	2.6	−5.4
Turnout		54,520	83.6	+1.3
Registered electors		65,194		
Conservative hold		Swing		

=== Elections in the 1970s ===
General election 1970: Barry
Party	Candidate	Votes	%	±%
Conservative	Raymond Gower	31,957	53.8	+2.5
Labour	John Allison	23,286	39.2	−9.5
Plaid Cymru	Ogwen Williams	4,200	7.1	N/A
Majority		8,671	14.6	+12.0
Turnout		59,443	79.2	−4.4
Registered electors		74,958		
Conservative hold		Swing		

General election February 1974: Barry
Party	Candidate	Votes	%	±%
Conservative	Raymond Gower	25,326	44.4	−6.1
Labour	John Brooks	19,779	34.7	−8.2
Liberal	J. Lloyd	10,048	17.6	N/A
Plaid Cymru	V. Wynne-Williams	1,924	3.4	−2.3
Majority		5,547	9.7	−4.9
Turnout		57,077	82.3	+3.1
Registered electors		69,356		
Conservative hold		Swing		

General election October 1974: Barry
Party	Candidate	Votes	%	±%
Conservative	Raymond Gower	23,360	43.0	−1.4
Labour	John Brooks	20,457	37.6	+2.9
Liberal	J. Lloyd	8,764	16.1	−1.5
Plaid Cymru	V. Wynne-Williams	1,793	3.3	−0.1
Majority		2,903	5.4	−4.3
Turnout		54,374	77.7	−4.6
Registered electors		69,992		
Conservative hold		Swing		

General election 1979: Barry
Party	Candidate	Votes	%	±%
Conservative	Raymond Gower	30,720	50.9	+7.9
Labour	P.P. Stead	21,928	36.3	−1.3
Liberal	W.N. Berritt	6,105	10.1	−6.0
Plaid Cymru	A.J. Dixon	1,281	2.1	−1.2
National Front	E.R. Kerton	312	0.5	N/A
Majority		8,792	14.6	+9.2
Turnout		60,349	80.3	+2.6
Registered electors		75,127		
Conservative hold		Swing		
