= Raymond Gower =

British politician

Sir Raymond Gower
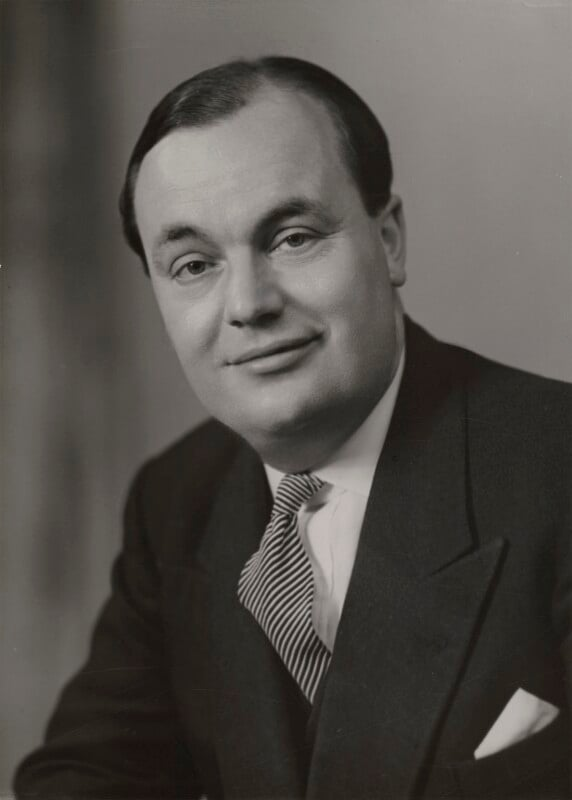
- Gower in 1953

Member of Parliament
- In office 25 October 1951 – 22 February 1989
- Preceded by: Dorothy Rees
- Succeeded by: John Smith
- Constituency: Barry (1951–1983); Vale of Glamorgan (1983–1989)

Personal details
- Born: Herbert Raymond Gower; 15 August 1916 Neath, Wales
- Died: 22 February 1989 (aged 72) Sully, Wales
- Party: Conservative
- Spouse: Cynthia Hobbs (m. 1973)
- Education: Cardiff School of Law

Sir Herbert Raymond Gower, FInstD (15 August 1916 – 22 February 1989) was a British Conservative Party Member of Parliament for over 37 years, representing seats in Glamorgan from 1951 to his death in 1989. He was also a journalist and broadcaster.

== Early life and career ==
Born in Neath on 15 August 1916, Gower was the son of the late Lawford R. Gower, FRIBA, County Architect for Glamorgan, and Mrs Gower. He was educated at Cardiff High School and Cardiff School of Law at University of Wales, Cardiff.

Gower was admitted as a solicitor in 1944. He practised in Cardiff from 1948 to 1963 and was a Partner at S. R. Freed & Co., Harewood Place, W1, London, from 1964 onwards. He was also Political Columnist at the Western Mail for Cardiff from 1951 to 1964.

== Parliamentary career ==
He first stood for Parliament at the 1950 general election, contesting the safe Labour seat of Ogmore, where he was beaten by Walter Padley.

Gower was elected as the MP for Barry in South Wales at the next general election in 1951. He was Parliamentary Private Secretary to Gurney Braithwaite (1951–54), Reginald Maudling (1951–52) John Profumo (1952–57), Hugh Molson (1954–57), the Minister of Transport and Civil Aviation, and to the Minister of Works (1957–60). Gower was also a member of the Speaker's Conference on Electoral Law from 1967 to 1969 and 1971 to 1974. He was a member of the Select Committee on Expenditure (1970–73) and the Select Committee on Welsh Affairs (1979–83). In 1966, he became Treasurer of the Welsh Parliamentary Party, subsequently being Chairman of the Welsh Conservative Members from 1970 to 1974, and again from 1979.

Boundary changes saw most of the seat transferred to the Vale of Glamorgan, which Gower represented from its creation for the 1983 general election. He remained a member of the House of Commons until he died in office in South Glamorgan in 1989, aged 72.

== Outside Parliament ==
Gower was joint Founder and Director of the first Welsh Unit Trust. In 1951, he became a Governor of University College, Cardiff. He was made a Member of the Court of Governors at the National Library of Wales that year, subsequently taking up that role at the National Museum of Wales (in 1952) and University College, Aberystwyth (in 1953). He was Vice-President at the National Chamber of Trade (1956–); Cardiff Business Club (1952) and South Wales Ramblers (1958–).

He was also Secretary of the Friends of Wales Society (Cultural), a member of the Welsh Advisory Council for Civil Aviation (1959–62). Gower was President of the Wales Area Conservative Teachers' Association (1962–) and the Glamorgan (London) Society (1967–69).

== Honours ==
In 1958, he became a Fellow of the Institute of Directors, and was awarded a knighthood in the 1974 New Years Honours List. He received the Freedom of the Borough of the Vale of Glamorgan on 13 April 1977.

== Personal life and death ==
In 1973, Gower married Cynthia, the daughter of Mr and Mrs James Hobbs. His recreations were tennis, squash rackets and travelling in Italy. Gower was a member of the Carlton and Royal Over-Seas League clubs. He lived in Sully, South Glamorgan.

On 22 February 1989, he suffered a fatal heart attack at his home following a day on the campaign trail for the Pontypridd by-election, which took place the next day. The consequent by-election in Gower's seat was won by Labour's John Smith (not to be confused with the party leader of the same name).

Parliament of the United Kingdom
| Preceded by Dorothy Rees | Member of Parliament for Barry; 1951–1983 | Constituency abolished |
| New constituency | Member of Parliament for Vale of Glamorgan; 1983–1989 | Succeeded by John Smith |
