= 1989 Vale of Glamorgan by-election =

UK parliamentary by-election

- 4 May 1989

Constituency of Vale of Glamorgan
- Turnout: 70.7% (▼8.6%)
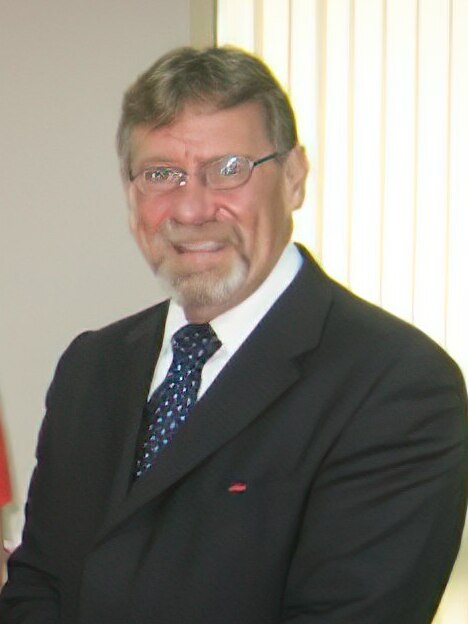

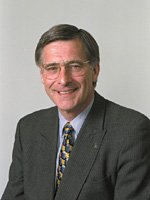
	First party	Second party
Candidate	John Smith	Rod Richards
Party	Labour	Conservative
Popular vote	23,342	17,314
Percentage	48.9%	36.3%
Swing	▲14.2%	▼10.5%
MP before election
Raymond Gower
Conservative
Subsequent MP
John Smith
Labour

A by-election was held for the British House of Commons constituency of Vale of Glamorgan on 4 May 1989 following the death of Conservative MP Sir Raymond Gower.

Eleven candidates stood, which remains the most in any Welsh by-election.

The result was a Labour gain, the party's first by-election gain of this parliamentary term, which came at a time when it was starting to match and even overtake the Conservative government in the opinion polls, just after the controversial poll tax was announced.

Neil Kinnock believed the result, which was reported as 'a massive victory' for Labour, showed a change in the Labour Party's fortunes, and stated "the tide has turned". The swing of 12.35 was significant as if repeated at the next general election would have resulted in Labour winning power. The result was reported by The Glasgow Herald as being a "humiliation" for both the Social and Liberal Democrats and SDP, the two centre parties which had emerged from the former SDP–Liberal Alliance. In the wake of the result the Social and Liberal Democrats' leader Paddy Ashdown called for SDP members to defect to his party, but this call was not supported by SDP leader David Owen, who instead indicated his party might be prepared to enter into a future coalition government with Labour.

Ultimately the seat was narrowly won back by the Conservatives at the 1992 general election.

1989 Vale of Glamorgan by-election
Party	Candidate	Votes	%	±%
Labour	John William Patrick Smith	23,342	48.9	+14.2
Conservative	Rod Richards	17,314	36.3	−10.5
SLD	Frank Leavers	2,017	4.2	−12.5
Plaid Cymru	John Dixon	1,672	3.5	+1.7
SDP	David Keith Davies	1,098	2.3	−15.4
Green	Marilyn Wakefield	971	2.0	N/A
Protect the Health Service	Christopher Tiarks	847	1.8	N/A
Monster Raving Loony	Screaming Lord Sutch	266	0.5	N/A
Independent Welsh Socialist	Eric Roberts	148	0.3	N/A
Corrective Party	Lindi St Claire	39	0.1	N/A
Christian Alliance	David Black	32	0.1	N/A
Majority		6,028	12.6	N/A
Turnout		47,746	70.7	−8.6
Registered electors		67,549		
Labour gain from Conservative		Swing	−12.4	

== See also ==
- List of United Kingdom by-elections
- Vale of Glamorgan (UK Parliament constituency)
