= Sully Hospital =

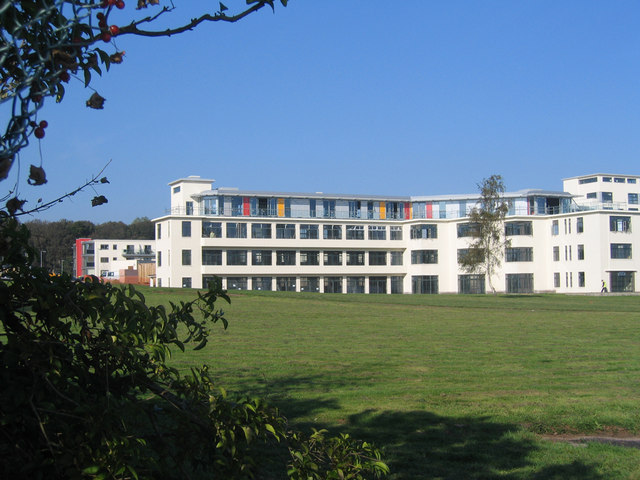
- Hayes Point, luxury apartments in the converted former Sully Hospital

- Shown in the Vale of Glamorgan

Geography
- Location: Sully, Vale of Glamorgan, Wales, United Kingdom
- Coordinates: 51.3996°N 3.2355°W

Organisation
- Care system: Public NHS
- Type: Specialist

Services
- Emergency department: No Accident & Emergency
- Speciality: Psychiatric hospital

History
- Founded: 1936
- Closed: 2001

Links
- Lists: Hospitals in Wales

Sully Hospital (Welsh: Ysbyty Sully) was a psychiatric hospital in Sully, Vale of Glamorgan, Wales. It has since been converted into luxury apartments and remains a Grade II* listed building.

== History ==
The classical and elegant Art Deco structure was designed by the firm of William Pite, Son and Fairweathers who had won an open competition to design the new building in 1931. Established by the King Edward VII Welsh National Memorial Association "for the intensive investigation of observation cases and for the treatment by modern methods of chronic and advanced pulmonary disease", it was built between 1932 and 1936 and officially opened by Prince George, Duke of Kent as a specialist tuberculosis facility in 1936. It is described in the Glamorgan volume of Nikolaus Pevsner's 'The Buildings of Wales' as "An outstanding example of inter-war architecture, which has survived almost unaltered" and is considered to be the finest representation of Modernist sanatoriums in Britain and one of the last great Modernist landmarks remaining in the whole of Wales. The design is similar to Alvar Aalto's Paimio Sanatorium in Finland, which was completed only three years earlier. As at Paimio, the use of a concrete structural frame enabled the use of wide windows, proving the patients with sunlight, fresh air and views.

During the Second World War it began to admit patients without tuberculosis, and it afterwards served as a general chest and heart treatment facility. During the war, it had general surgery wards and its own maternity unit. In 1943 there was a Battalion of American Seabees, the US Construction Corps, living on a merchant vessel tied up in Penarth docks, while they built a large number of Quonset huts for a rapid temporary expansions of Sully Hospital needed for the extra wartime pressure of additional patients, both military and civilian. Many of the Quonset huts remained in use as overflow accommodation until the mid-1960s. In 1993 the hospital switched to residential psychiatric care until its final closure as a hospital in 2001.

While standing vacant the hospital building was briefly considered as a potential location for the temporary housing of up to 750 Eastern European asylum seekers, but those plans were eventually shelved after a campaign and objections by local residents. In the early 21st century the building was converted into individual luxury apartments by the investment property company Galliard Homes.
