= Sully, Vale of Glamorgan =

Coordinates: 51.41°N 3.21°W

Sully: Welsh: (Sili)
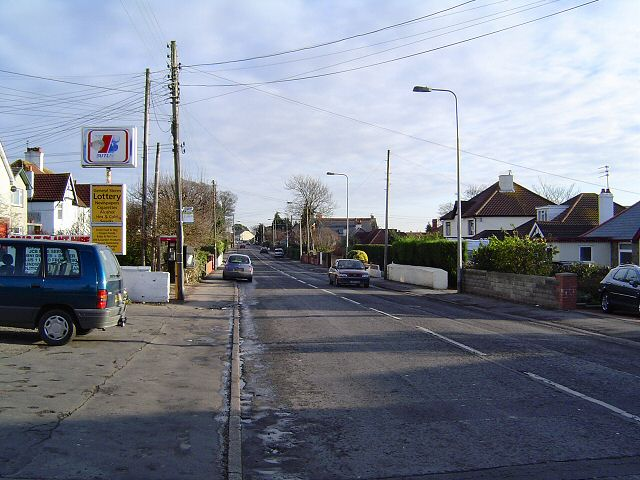
- Part of South Road, the main village road, facing East towards Penarth and Cardiff

- Location within the Vale of Glamorgan
- Population: 4,543 (Community and ward 2011)
- OS grid reference: ST155683
- Community: Sully and Lavernock
- Principal area: Vale of Glamorgan
- Preserved county: South Glamorgan
- Country: Wales
- Sovereign state: United Kingdom
- Post town: PENARTH
- Postcode district: CF64
- Dialling code: 029
- Police: South Wales
- Fire: South Wales
- Ambulance: Welsh
- UK Parliament: Cardiff South & Penarth
- Senedd Cymru – Welsh Parliament: Cardiff South and Penarth

Sully (Welsh: Sili) is a village in the community of Sully and Lavernock, in the Vale of Glamorgan, Wales, lying on the northern coast of the Bristol Channel, midway between the towns of Penarth and Barry and 7 miles (11 kilometres) southwest of the Welsh capital city of Cardiff.

== Toponymy ==
The origins of the name Sully / Sili are unclear, but the most likely explanation is that it is a Norman name, taken from the de Sully family who were in possession of the manor in the twelfth century. If so, it may be that neither the Welsh or English forms are based on the other, but that both are derived from the Norman name. There is strong documentary evidence for the Welsh form over several centuries, and in the local dialect of Welsh that was spoken in the area into the twentieth century, the name was pronounced Welsh pronunciation: [ˈsili] or Welsh pronunciation: [ˈʃili], which corresponds to the modern Welsh form Sili. If the name is Norman, it is likely that the Welsh form is closer to the original pronunciation than its English equivalent.

Bilingual road signs at either end of the village announce Sully and Sili. Although both forms could be considered to have unfavourable connotations, only the Welsh name has been controversial, as some residents have expressed the view that it belittles the village.

It has been suggested that Abersili would be a more appropriate Welsh name, and an unofficial referendum has shown significant support for that view amongst residents. But it is unclear whether the name Abersili has ever been in common use; the earliest known example is by Iolo Morganwg, a notoriously untrustworthy source. Furthermore, Abersili means 'the mouth of the river Sili', but Sully Brook (assuming that that is the watercourse in question) does not reach the sea at Sully, but joins the Cadoxton River farther west near what is now Barry Docks. As such, the name has been considered inappropriate for Sully itself.

The Welsh Language Board has stated that Sili is found in the standard reference works and that it is 'well-established in Welsh writing and is used widely both locally and nationally'.

== History ==
=== Medieval Sully ===
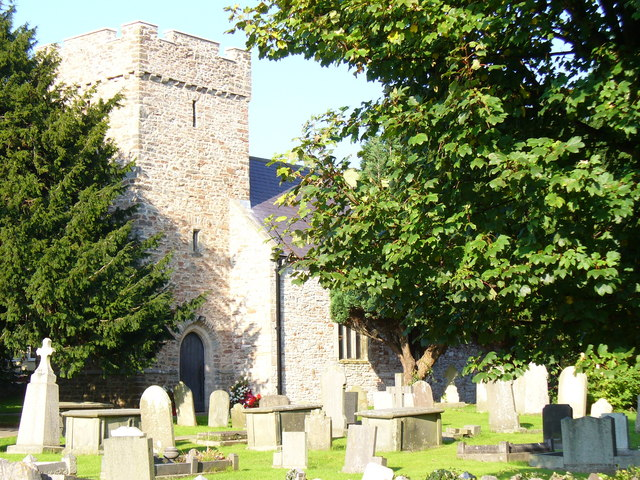
Sully Church

The village could be named as an abbreviation of "south lea" meaning "southern pasture" but it is more commonly understood to be named after the noble Norman family of Baron Reginald de Sully, one of the 'Twelve Knights of Glamorgan' who was awarded the Manor around 1093 by the conqueror of Glamorgan Sir Robert Fitzhamon, probably under charter by William II of England. In 1591 Sir Edward Mansel of Margam wrote his historical document recording 'The winning of Glamorgan' and recorded:

"To Sir Reginald de Sully he (Fitz Haymon) gave the castle and town to be called Sully with the Manor of it, and the Manors of St Andrews and Dinas Powys for his Granary and provisions. This Sir Reginald bestowed much land in fee frankliege to his men and came to be a man of wealth and fame. He had at Sully besides his Castle a fair Manor house built after a new manner, where he did live the most of his time, which house as well as the Castle was broke down by Owain Glendower"

De Sully also had extensive estates in Devon but he is recorded as having built a small fortified castle in Sully, the remains of which have mostly vanished, except for a short length of wall, located to the east of the Norman parish church in the village. The site of a 13th-century moated manor house can still be observed on Sully Moors.

The castle at Sully was the smallest in Glamorgan by a very long way. It covered a site of only about half an acre and stood in a location that was, until only recently, called Castle Wood. Occupation of the castle lasted less than three hundred years till around the mid 14th century, probably as a result of the extinction of the de Sully family line. The present church dates from around the same time as the castle and is dedicated to St. John the Baptist. The resident Sully clergyman has always been referred to as the Rector which indicates the tithes that produced his annual income were never appropriated by a monastery and he was therefore probably supported by the Lord of the Manor directly, although appointed by the Bishop.

There is a mostly complete late medieval lime kiln on Ashby Road, Sully. Composed of stone and brick it is 40 feet long and 18 feet high by 13 feet wide. Buttressed with three brick on edge archways and draught holes on the south elevation. Five iron pegs are inserted into the face of the kiln. Briarside and Middleton Cottage on Cog Road is a yeoman's cottage built in the mid 16th century with later 18th century additions. The cottage contains a Tudor-style archway and an original circular stone staircase. The remains of the village mill can be found at Hayes Farm on Hayes Road.

=== Changes in the manor ===
The Manor of Sully reverted to Crown ownership and is recorded as being sold in its entirety to Sir Thomas Stradling in 1538. It remained in the Stradling family for exactly two hundred years after which it was administered first by Christopher Mansel and later by Bussy Mansel until his death in 1780.

Stradling's Estate Act 1755
- Act of Parliament
- Parliament of Great Britain
- Long title: An Act for Sale of Part of the Estate late of Sir Thomas Stradling Baronet, deceased, in the Counties of Glamorgan and Somerset, for discharging Encumbrances affecting the same; and for a Division and Settlement of other Part thereof; and for other Purposes therein mentioned.
- Citation: 28 Geo. 2. c. 9 Pr.
- Territorial extent: Great Britain

Dates
- Royal assent: 20 March 1755
- Commencement: 14 November 1754 (Note: Start of session.)

Status: Current legislation

There followed a number of lawsuits with several landowners claiming rights to the manor until a private act of Parliament, Stradling's Estate Act 1755 (28 Geo. 2. c. 9 Pr.) granted the manors of both St. Donats and Sully to Sir John de la Fountaine Tyrwhit. It stayed in his family until 1811 although the family had changed their name to Drake by then. When the last of the Drake family died without heirs the estate was sold by public auction to a Mr Evan Thomas who resided in Old Sully House until he died in 1832. Thomas built Cog Farm between 1816 and 1817. The rickstands at Cog Farm are probably contemporary. The eight circular rickstands are approximately 3 metres high, stone built and lipped at the top. In plan they form a right angle at the edge of the former rickyard. The rickstands kept unthreshed corn above the moist ground and the lips provided protection against rodents.

There was a six-year gap while ownership was disputed until in 1838 the estate was finally taken by Sir Josiah John Guest of Dowlais and Merthyr Tydfil, whose eldest son would later become the first Lord Wimborne of Ashby. In 1889 Lord Wimborne purchased the rights to use the Sully foreshore for the manor estate purposes.

By the early 20th century Lord Wimborne's estate began to sell off various lands within the parish, and during 1914 the last of the Sully estate interests were sold at public auction to a number of individual private landowners, the main purchaser being Lieutenant-Commander Charles E. Evans, RNVR, who in 1917 split his overall Sully holding into a number of rented properties. These various properties then formed part of Evans' estate, which in 1956 was established as a private limited letting company (Evans' Estate (1956) Ltd), based in Newton Abbott, Devon.

=== Village growth ===
In the 19th century Sully was almost entirely agricultural in nature and the population fluctuated between only 150 to 200 individuals. By 1920 this had still only increased to 550 despite the explosive growths of nearby Penarth and Barry. However, in just the past forty years Sully has grown steadily along the various commercial plastics factory developments and with the wider spread of private car ownership. Sully is now mainly a middle income dormitory suburb of Cardiff with a still expanding population of just over 5,000.

From 1890 until the end of the 1960s Sully was connected eastwards to Penarth and Cardiff and westwards to Barry and the South Wales Valleys by an extension of the Taff Vale Railway line. The coastal spur fell victim to the sweeping Beeching Axe in 1968. Sully station, on Cog Road opposite the Sully Inn and Swanbridge Halt were closed. The redundant rail track bed and station buildings have mostly been sold into private ownership and built on, with any unsold stretches being overgrown and impassable as far as the Fort Road bridge at Lavernock. Between Lavernock and Penarth the track bed is a rural greenway and cycle track.

In the 1960s the local plastics factory and principal employers in the immediate area, a subsidiary of Distillers Company, built a new sports and social club at the east end of the village, opposite Swanbridge Halt railway station. In 1966 members of the club formed a rugby team initially known as 'Barry Plastics RFC' but now renamed as 'Sully View RFC'. Today Sully Sports & Social Club fields three teams in the Cardiff and District Rugby Union and the sides are regular competitors in the Welsh Brewers Cup, the Mallett Cup and the Ninian Stuart Cup. Touring venues have included Holland, Spain, Germany and Belgium, as well as many within the U.K.

=== SS Pilton ===
SS Pilton was a ship that ran aground on Sully Beach in 1924. Owned by William J. Tatem of Cardiff, Pilton ran aground during gale-force winds in December 1924. She was aground for three months, and provided a steady source of income for Sully caterers from the large number visitors arriving by train to view the spectacle.

== Governance ==
=== Community council ===
Sully is represented by nine community councillors of Sully and Lavernock Community Council, elected from the community wards of Lavernock (2) and Sully (7).

=== County council ===
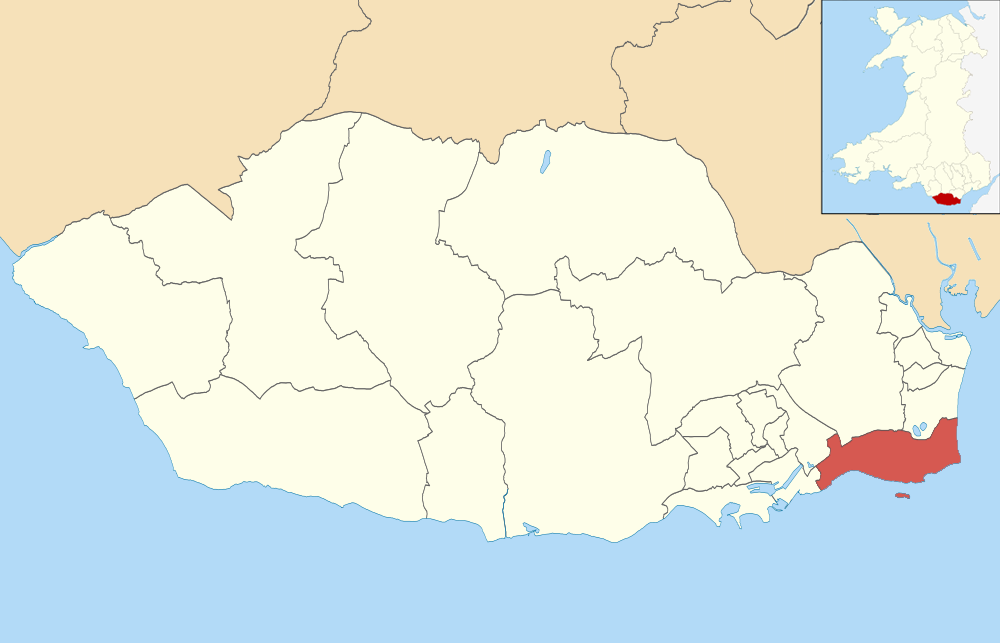
Location of the Sully ward within the Vale of Glamorgan

Sully is also a county ward which has representatives on the Vale of Glamorgan County Council. The ward elected two Independent councillors to sit on the County Council in the May 2017 election.

Vale of Glamorgan Council election, May 2017
Party	Candidate	Votes	%	±%
Independent	Bob PENROSE *	904		
Independent	Kevin Phillip MAHONEY *	782		
Conservative	Rod THOMAS	763		
Conservative	Chris THORNE	726		
Labour	Laura ROCHEFORT	293		
Plaid Cymru	John RIMINGTOM	137		
Independent hold		Swing		
Independent gain from UKIP		Swing		

Cllr Mahoney had been elected for UKIP at the previous elections in 2012. He 're-designated' himself as an independent in February 2016 over disagreements with UKIP's approach to the Welsh Government.

Prior to the May 2004 Vale of Glamorgan Council elections the ward elected only one councillor to the county council, increasing to two following The County Borough of The Vale of Glamorgan (Electoral Changes) Order 2002.

=== National government ===
The ward falls within the Cardiff South and Penarth constituency for the Westminster Parliament, and within the Cardiff South and Penarth constituency in the National Assembly for Wales.

== Landmarks ==
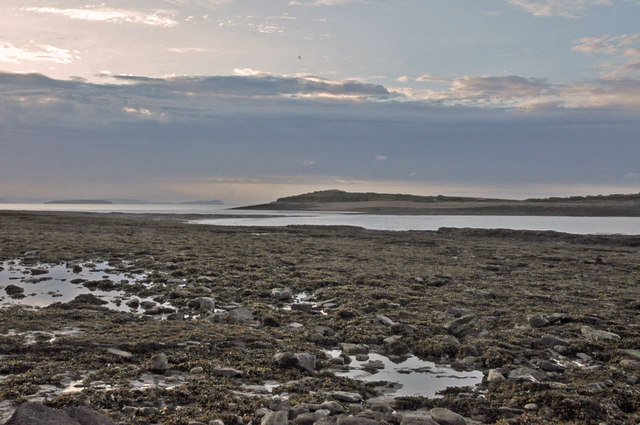
Coastline looking towards Sully Island

The St John Baptist Church, known as Sully Church, is a Grade II listed building. The hamlet of Swanbridge includes a caravan park and holiday camp and The Captain's Wife public house, which opened in 1977 after a conversion of several quayside cottages. There is foot access at low tide from the pub car park to Sully Island but tides are high and fast - and therefore dangerous. There is an access time of only three hours each side of low tides and extreme care is advised. The Atlantic Trading Estate is between Sully and Barry, and The Bendricks is a major site of interest for paleontologists due to its extensive fossils. Sully Island is situated off the coast.

Sully School moved to its present site in 1936. It is a primary school with a twenty-six place nursery unit. There are over 400 pupils and seventeen teachers. There are no secondary schools in the village. Most children attend Stanwell School in nearby Penarth. Sully School is a main feeder school for Stanwell School and other schools are selected by parental choice. Free school bus services are provided.

Sully Hospital is described in the Glamorgan section of Nikolaus Pevsner’s ‘The Buildings of Wales’ as “An outstanding example of inter-war architecture, which has survived almost unaltered” and is considered to be the finest representation of Modernist sanatoriums in Britain and one of the last great Modernist landmarks remaining in the whole of Wales.

== Transport ==
The main road going through Sully is South Road. It is one of three roads which form part of the B4267, running from near Cog Road up to Swanbridge Road on the border with Lavernock. The other two parts of the B4267 are Sully Moors Road, leading up to roundabout just into the border of Barry and Lavernock Road, leading up to Penarth near Stanwell School.

Sully railway station was opened by the Taff Valley Railway in 1865. It ran on the Penarth line through: Alberta Halt (by the Archer Road bridge), Lower Penarth (Cosmeston) Halt, Lavernock Halt, Swanbridge Halt and Sully. However, rail services from Penarth ceased to operate in 1968 as a result of the Beeching Axe, which affected many branch lines all over the country. As a result, Sully no longer has a railway service. At present, the nearest station is Cadoxton, on the Barry branch of the Vale of Glamorgan Line operated by Transport for Wales, approximately 2.1 miles away, roughly about a forty-minute walk.

Bus services are provided by Cardiff Bus, who operate route 94 between Cardiff and Barry via Penarth half-hourly on weekdays and hourly on evenings and Sundays. Journey times to Barry are approximately twenty minutes, journey times into Penarth are approximately fifteen minutes and journey times into Cardiff are just over half an hour. A second service, route 88, is run by Easyway runs between Lower Penarth and Barry with journey times to both places being approximately 15 minutes.

== In popular culture ==
Sully is featured in the third series of the BBC One/BBC Three hit sitcom Gavin & Stacey, when the character of Ness, played by Ruth Jones, moves into a caravan in the village with fiancé Dave Coaches.

In the Big Finish Torchwood audio episode Flight 405, Yvonne Hartman says that a crashing plane will cause a dent in the house prices of Sully, as well as in Sully itself.

== Notable people ==
- Hana Lili, pop singer
- Thomas Frederick Worrall, Watercolour artist
