= List of shipwrecks in the Bristol Channel =

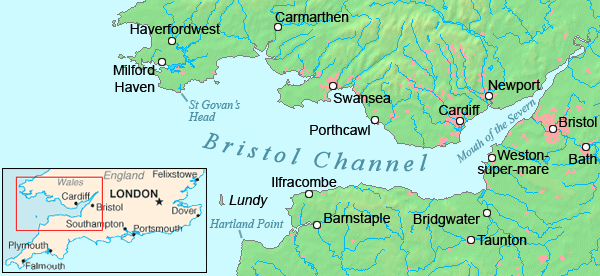
The Bristol Channel

A number of ships have run aground or sunk in the Bristol Channel, a stretch of water between southern Wales, Devon and Somerset. Cardiff, Barry and Penarth were once the largest coal exporters in the world and the channel received significant traffic at the beginning of the twentieth century during exportation.

In 1948 there were 24 known wrecks in the Bristol Channel, but by 1950 14 had been cleared by demolition. One ship, a tanker of over 10,000 tons that was sunk off Nash Point, required the use of 129 tons of explosives by HMS Tronda to break up the wreck.

== Bristol Packet - 1808 ==
In 1808 a ship, believed to be the Bristol Packet, which had been built in 1801 was wrecked on Madbrian Sands at Minehead.

== The Neptune - 1831 ==
The Neptune was a vessel sailing from Newport to Wexford in Ireland and struck a rock on 28 November 1831 off the coast of Porthkerry, near what is now Barry.

== Lizzy - 1854 ==
The ketch, Lizzy, was wrecked at Gore point, near Porlock Weir. The ship, built in Appledore, was spotted in trouble off Lynmouth in a storm during 1854. The ship had lost her masts, and was in very bad condition. A fishing boat was sent out to rescue the crew, as Lynmouth possessed no lifeboat at this time. The boat managed to reach the stricken ketch, rescue the crew and get back to Lynmouth safely. The weather then began to improve, and a fresh crew, together with the original skipper of the vessel, went out to attempt to salvage her. They improvised with a scrap of sail, and managed to get safely around Foreland Point. They sailed on all night, only just managing to keep the ship afloat. Finally, when they got to Gore Point, just a mile from Porlock weir, they sank in shallow water. The remains of the ship lie submerged just off the point.

== Nornen - 1897 ==
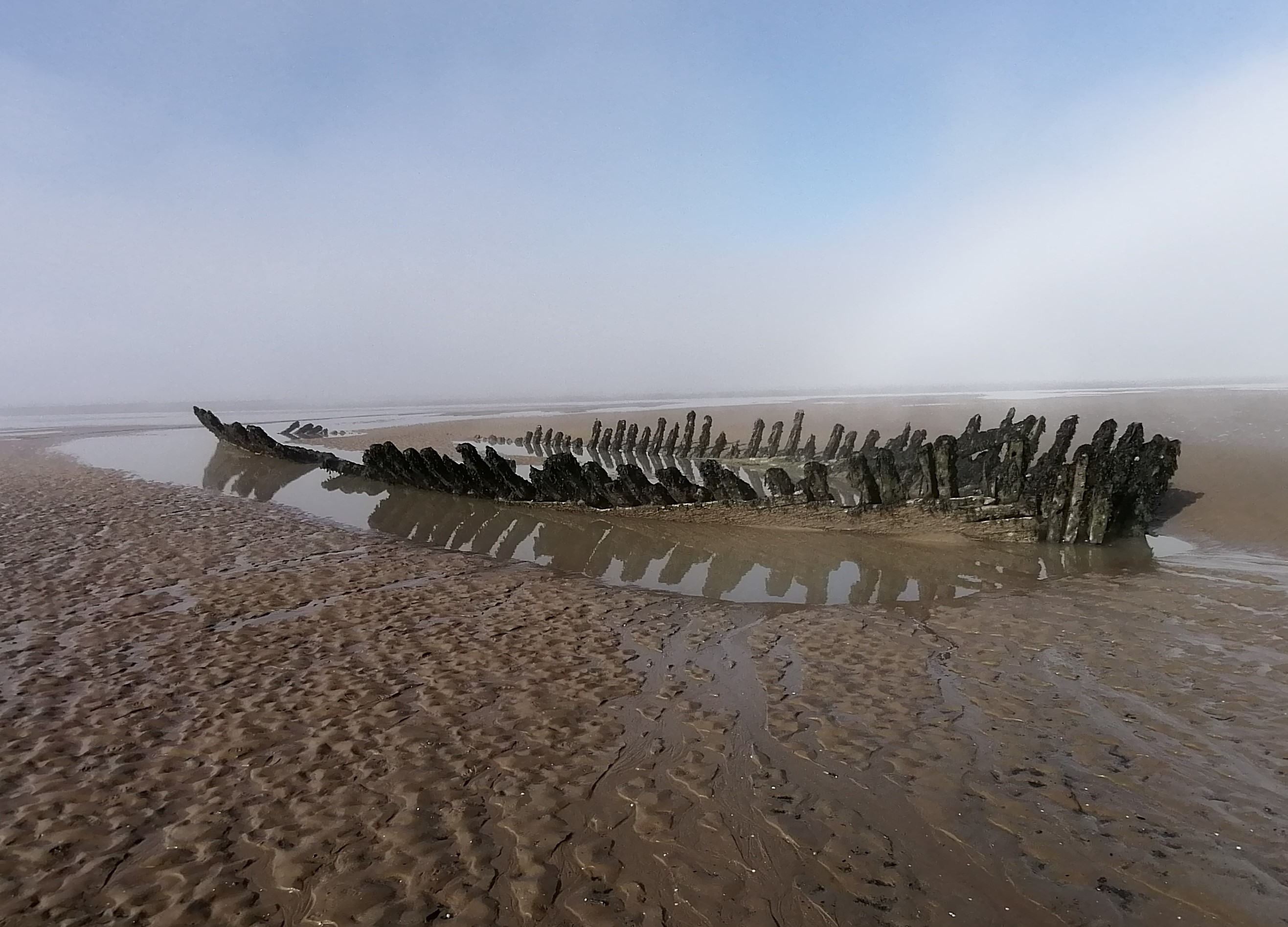
The Nornen, March 2021

The Norwegian barque Nornen ran aground on Berrow beach, Somerset, 3 March. The ship was built and launched in 1876 at Chantiers de la Roque of Bordeaux, France. She was named the Maipu, and ran under the French shipping line A.D Bordes & Fils. From 1888 she was operated by Larson Ludwig & Co, Brevik. Peder Olsen was the captain for her final three years, frequently running trade routes between American east coast ports and Europe. During the night of 2/3 March, a major storm battered the coasts of south-west England. Captain Olsen made an attempt to shelter in the lee of Lundy Island, but this was in vain. With sails torn, the crew were powerless against the rough swells and driving sleet. RNLI lifeboat Godfrey Morris was launched from Burnham-on-sea. All crew and the ship's dog were rescued. The vessel's skeleton can be seen at low tide - only parts of the lower hull and keel remain.

== Salado - 1897 ==
The Salado was en route from Newport to Buenos Aires, Argentina. Ran aground in thick fog, 21 March 1897 at 5 am. Mouse Hole & Trap Rock near Lundy. Master: James Muckle Rainnie, certificate 998117, no loss of life. Inquiry no. 5518, certificate suspended for 3 months.

== Verajean - 1908 ==
The Verajean was an exporting ship that was driven ashore at Rhoose point near Barry in south Wales in 1908. The ship was stranded for a fortnight, and to lighten it, her cargo of coal bricks was unloaded onto the beach. Grateful residents filled their coal cellars with enough fuel for two winters.

== Cambo - 1912 ==
The Cambo, photo dated 1 August 1912

The Cambo was an exporting ship that sunk at Barry in South Wales in 1912. After hitting the Eastern breakwater and running aground, the badly damaged Cambo was towed off by tugs. Later that day, she caught fire and sank. She was later refloated and repaired at Barry Docks.

== Bengrove - 1915 ==
The SS Bengrove was a steamer type collier ship owned by the United Kingdom. Thousands of people on shore witnessed the ship explode and sink in the Bristol Channel on Sunday, 7 March 1915.

The ship left Barry at approximately 4:00 a.m. under sealed orders and carrying a cargo of 5,000 tons of coal. Later that day at about 5 miles (8.0 km) off the coast of Ilfracombe in the Bristol Channel, an explosion occurred midship under the vessel. The ship's siren was activated and the crew entered the lifeboats, the siren was heard on shore and the Ilfracombe coast guard dispatched lifeboats to the area. There were 21 other steamers in the area when the explosion occurred, six of them offered assistance to the foundering vessel. All 33 crewmen were saved and taken to Ilfracombe pier. Early reports were unsure what caused the explosion with speculation pointing to a mine or torpedo, however, it was determined to have been struck by a torpedo from the German U-boat U-20.

== Pilton - 1924 ==
The Pilton was a ship that ran aground on Sully Beach in 1924. Owned by WJ Tatem of Cardiff, the Pilton ran aground during gale force winds in December 1924. She was aground for three months, and provided a steady source of income for Sully caterers from visitors.

== Pelican - 1928 ==
The steamship Pelican grounded in Minehead, Somerset on 22 June 1928. The ship was grounded on an unmarked reef, known as the Gables, which circles Minehead bay while sailing from Port Talbot to Highbridge. The crew of five were rescued by the Minehead lifeboat.

== Tafleburg, 1941 ==
The Tafleburg was a ship that ran aground in Whitmore Bay in Barry Island in south Wales on 28 January 1941. The whale factory ship struck a mine in the channel and was beached to the west of Cold Knap Point. On 28 March, she was refloated and moved to Whitmore Bay. She landed on a sandbar and broke into two sections. She was later repaired.

== Walter L M Russ - 1945 ==
The steamer Walter L M Russ ran aground on 15 July 1945 at Grassholm and was wrecked. Nine crew were rescued by the Angle Lifeboat.

== See also ==
- Sea Empress - an oil tanker that ran aground at Milford Haven in February 1996.
