= Dorothy Rees =

British politician (1898–1987)

Dame Dorothy Mary Rees DBE

Member of Parliament for Barry
- In office 23 February 1950 – 5 October 1951
- Preceded by: New constituency
- Succeeded by: Raymond Gower

Personal details
- Born: Dorothy Mary Jones; 29 July 1898
- Died: 20 August 1987 (aged 89)
- Party: Labour
- Spouse: David George Rees (the eldest son of David F. Rees of Barry)

Dame Dorothy Mary Rees DBE (née Jones; 29 July 1898 – 20 August 1987) was a Labour Party politician in the United Kingdom, and was briefly a member of parliament (MP).

Parliament of the United Kingdom
New constituency	Member of Parliament for Barry; 1950 – 1951	Succeeded by Sir Raymond Gower
