= David Young =

David or Dave Young may refer to:

== Entertainment and art ==
- David Young (poet) (1936–2025), American poet, translator, editor, literary critic and professor
- David Young (Canadian playwright) (born 1946), Canadian playwright and novelist
- David Young (novelist) (born 1958), British novelist
- David Young (judge), daytime court television show judge in Miami
- Judge David Young, daytime court television show
- David Young (TV producer), British game show producer
- David Young (Neighbours), fictional character on Australian soap opera Neighbours
- David Young, founding editor of the Farmers' Almanac, 1818
- David Young, writer and actor for CollegeHumor web site

== Music ==
- David Young (saxophonist) (1912–1992), American jazz tenor saxophonist
- Dave Young (bassist) (born 1940), Canadian jazz double bassist
- David Young (guitarist) (1949–2022), English musician, record producer and sound engineer
- Dave Young (musician, born 1982), Canadian rock musician
- David Young (recorder musician) (active from 1990), American recorder musician
- David Young (composer) (1957–2024), American video game music composer

== Politics ==
- David Young (Labour politician) (1930–2003), British Labour Party MP, 1974–1997
- David Young, Baron Young of Graffham (1932–2022), British politician and Cabinet minister from the 1980s
- David Young (Ontario politician) (born 1957), Canadian politician in Ontario
- David Young (Watergate) (1936–2025), member of a covert ops team under U.S. President Richard Nixon
- David Young (Iowa politician) (born 1968), former member of the U.S. House of Representatives and current member of the Iowa House of Representatives
- David Young (North Carolina politician) (born 1959), businessman and chairman of the North Carolina Democratic Party
- Dave Young (Colorado politician), Colorado state treasurer
- David Young III (1905–1977), American politician in New Jersey
- David Young (Louisiana politician) (1836–1907), state senator
- David Young (diplomat), American diplomat

== Sports ==
=== Football and rugby ===
- David Young (footballer, born 1945) (1945–2026), English footballer for Newcastle, Sunderland, Charlton, and Southend in the 1970s
- David Young (Australian footballer) (born 1954), Australian rules footballer for South Melbourne and Collingwood
- Dave Young (American football) (1959–2023), tight end selected in the 1981 NFL Draft
- David Young (footballer, born 1965), English footballer for Darlington in the 1980s
- David Young (American football) (born 1979), defensive back selected in the 2003 NFL Draft
- Dai Young (born 1967), Welsh rugby union and Rugby league international and British Lion
- Dave Young (rugby union) (born 1985), Irish rugby union player
- Dave Young (footballer) (born 1962), former Wigan Athletic player

=== Other sports ===
- David Turquand-Young (1904–1984), British modern pentathlete
- David Young (American swimmer) (1907–1988), American Olympic swimmer
- David Young (Fijian swimmer) (born 2005), Fijian swimmer
- David Young (wrestler) (born 1972), American professional wrestler
- David Young (cricketer) (born 1977), English cricketer
- David Young (basketball) (born 1981), drafted by the Seattle SuperSonics
- David Young (hurler) (born 1985), Irish sportsperson
- David Young (rower), English rower
- David Young (discus thrower) (c. 1914–1983), Scottish athlete

== Other ==
- David Young (bishop) (1931–2008), British Anglican bishop; Bishop of Ripon
- David Young (cleric) (1844–1913), Welsh Wesleyan minister and historian
- David G. Young III, U.S. Air Force general
- David Young (British Army officer) (1926–2000), General Officer Commanding Scotland
- David Allan Young (1915–1991), American entomologist
- David M. Young Jr. (1923–2008), American mathematician
- David Young (bomber), former policeman who took hostages at an elementary school in Cokeville, Wyoming, 1986
