= 1931 Glamorgan County Council election =

1931 Welsh local government election

The fourteenth election to Glamorgan County Council, south Wales, took place in March 1931. It was preceded by the 1928 election and followed by the 1934 election.

== Overview of the result ==
Labour was defending a secure majority in an election where they faced opposition from the left in the form of the Communist Party, as well as more traditional opponents. The result showed little change from previous years.

== Boundary changes ==
There were no boundary changes at this election.

== Candidates ==
13 candidates were returned unopposed.

== Contested elections ==
Most of the retiring aldermen were returned.

== Outcome ==
Labour retains its majority. The party won some additional seats, such as Pentre in the Rhondda where T.A. Thomas had held on against several previous Labour challenges.

In the Cymmer ward, David Thomas, who had failed to hold the seat in 1928 after David Watts-Morgan was elected alderman, was successful after the sitting Independent stood down.

== Ward results ==
=== Aberaman ===
Aberaman 1931
Party	Candidate	Votes	%	±%
Labour	Florence Rose Davies**	2,408		
Independent	T.Ll. Davies	1,833		
Majority		575		
Labour hold		Swing		

=== Aberavon ===
Aberavon 1931
Party	Candidate	Votes	%	±%
Labour	Edward Lewis Hare*	2,292		
Independent	Horace Hyde Macey	1,408		
Majority		884		
Labour hold		Swing		

=== Abercynon ===
Abercynon 1931
Party	Candidate	Votes	%	±%
Labour	Joseph Dicks**	2,434		
Liberal	Edward J. Thomas	1,063		
Majority		1,381		
Labour hold		Swing		

=== Aberdare Town ===
Aberdare Town 1931
Party	Candidate	Votes	%	±%
Independent	William Thomas*	Unopposed		
Independent hold		Swing		

=== Bargoed ===
The sitting member had been elected as the official Labour candidate in 1928.

Bargoed 1931
Party	Candidate	Votes	%	±%
Independent Labour	William Henry Hopkins*	2,434		
Independent	T.C. Jones	1,204		
Labour	Moses C. Price	550		
Majority		1,230		
Independent Labour hold		Swing		

=== Barry ===
Barry 1931
Party	Candidate	Votes	%	±%
Independent	Rev D.H. Williams**	1,953		
Labour	Rev R.H. Lomas*	1,494		
Majority		459		
Independent gain from Labour		Swing		

=== Barry Dock ===
Barry Dock 1931
Party	Candidate	Votes	%	±%
Liberal	W.M. Davies*	Unopposed		
Liberal hold		Swing		

=== Blaengwawr ===
Blaengwawr 1931
Party	Candidate	Votes	%	±%
Labour	William J. Edwards*	1,156		
Independent	Henry Vause	518		
Communist	Trevor Williams	152		
Majority		638		
Labour hold		Swing		

=== Bridgend ===
Bridgend 1931
Party	Candidate	Votes	%	±%
Independent Liberal	Dapho Llewellyn Powell*	1,713		
Ind. Conservative	William W. Phillips	1,227		
Majority		486		
Independent hold		Swing		

=== Briton Ferry ===
Briton Ferry 1931
Party	Candidate	Votes	%	±%
Labour	George Gethin*	2,068		
Conservative	J.M. Bevan	1,500		
Majority		568		
Labour hold		Swing		

=== Cadoxton ===
Cadoxton 1931
Party	Candidate	Votes	%	±%
Independent	Dudley Thomas Howe	1,631		
Labour	Frederick Cook	1,160		
Majority		471		
Independent hold		Swing		

=== Caerphilly ===
Caerphilly 1931
Party	Candidate	Votes	%	±%
Labour	Evan Phillips	2,183		
Independent	Joseph Howells**	2,119		
Communist	Edward Withers	101		
Majority		64		
Labour gain from Independent		Swing		

=== Cilfynydd ===
Cilfynydd 1931
Party	Candidate	Votes	%	±%
Labour	Arthur Pearson*	2,306		
Independent	Ivor W. Thomas	1,358		
Majority		948		
Labour hold		Swing		

=== Coedffranc ===
Coedffranc 1931
Party	Candidate	Votes	%	±%
Independent	Ogley L. David	2,170		
Labour	W. Phillip Jenkins*	1,867		
Majority		303		
Independent gain from Labour		Swing		

=== Cowbridge ===
Cowbridge 1931
Party	Candidate	Votes	%	±%
Independent	George Lougher	2,147		
Labour	Emily Jones	1,487		
Majority		660		
Independent hold		Swing		

=== Cwm Aber ===
Cwm Aber 1931
Party	Candidate	Votes	%	±%
Labour	Rev David M. Jones*	2,462		
Independent	Griffith H. Lloyd	845		
Communist	F. Parrish	95		
Majority		1,617		
Labour hold		Swing		

=== Cwmavon ===
Cwmavon 1931
Party	Candidate	Votes	%	±%
Labour	John Jones Edwards*	Unopposed		
Labour hold		Swing		

=== Cymmer ===
Cymmer 1931
Party	Candidate	Votes	%	±%
Labour	David Thomas	997		
Independent	Brinley Ithel Rowlands	775		
Majority		222		
Labour gain from Independent		Swing		

=== Dinas Powys ===
Dinas Powys 1931
Party	Candidate	Votes	%	±%
Independent	Ivor Broadbent Thomas*	Unopposed		
Independent hold		Swing		

=== Dulais Valley ===
Dulais Valley 1931
Party	Candidate	Votes	%	±%
Labour	Gwilym Davies*	Unopposed		
Labour hold		Swing		

=== Ferndale ===
Ferndale 1931
Party	Candidate	Votes	%	±%
Independent	Alfred Evans*	Unopposed		
Independent hold		Swing		

=== Gadlys ===
Gadlys 1931
Party	Candidate	Votes	%	±%
Labour	John Prowle	1,328		
Independent	T. Marchant Harries*	1,000		
Majority		328		
Labour gain from Independent		Swing		

=== Glyncorrwg ===
Glyncorrwg 1931
Party	Candidate	Votes	%	±%
Labour	Sir William Jenkins**	Unopposed		
Labour hold		Swing		

=== Gower ===
W.H. Davies had won the seat in 1919, and was elected alderman. He failed to be re-elected in 1925 and 1928.

Gower 1931
Party	Candidate	Votes	%	±%
Labour	William Henry Davies	1,761		
Independent	Frederick W. Davies*	1,602		
Majority		159		
Labour gain from Independent		Swing		

=== Hengoed ===
Hengoed 1931
Party	Candidate	Votes	%	±%
Labour	Thomas Evans*	1,900		
Independent	T.B. Fisher	1,551		
Majority		349		
Labour hold		Swing		

=== Hopkinstown ===
Hopkinstown 1931
Party	Candidate	Votes	%	±%
Labour	E.H. Fleming**	Unopposed		
Labour hold		Swing		

=== Kibbor ===
Kibbor 1931
Party	Candidate	Votes	%	±%
Independent	Edgar L. Chappell	1,769		
Independent	John Kane	1,400		
Majority		369		
Independent hold		Swing		

=== Llandaff ===
Llandaff 1931
Party	Candidate	Votes	%	±%
Ind. Conservative	Sir Lewis Lougher*	862		
Independent Liberal	Mary Annie Powell	440		
Majority		422		
Independent hold		Swing		

=== Llandeilo Talybont ===
Llandeilo Talybont 1931
Party	Candidate	Votes	%	±%
Labour	Caradoc Jones**	1,885		
Independent	Alfred Morgan	1,153		
Majority		732		
Labour hold		Swing		

=== Llanfabon ===
Llanfabon 1931
Party	Candidate	Votes	%	±%
Labour	William Bowen*	1,596		
Independent	Arthur Hopkins	966		
Majority		630		
Labour hold		Swing		

=== Llwydcoed ===
Llwydcoed 1931
Party	Candidate	Votes	%	±%
Independent	Martha Emma Jones*	1,563		
Labour	Owen Powell	926		
Majority		637		
Independent hold		Swing		

=== Llwynypia ===
Llwynypia 1931
Party	Candidate	Votes	%	±%
Labour	Philip Haines Rowlands*	2,241		
Communist	Lewis R. Jones	154		
Majority		2,067		
Labour hold		Swing		

=== Loughor ===
Loughor 1931
Party	Candidate	Votes	%	±%
Independent	Thomas J. Thomas*	2,245		
Labour	David J. Davies	1,854		
Communist	Sarah Edith Williams	143		
Majority		391		
Independent hold		Swing		

=== Maesteg, Caerau and Nantyffyllon ===
Maesteg, Caerau and Nantyffyllon 1931
Party	Candidate	Votes	%	±%
Labour	John Evans**	2,162		
Independent	Brinley Richards	984		
Communist	Benjamin Francis	914		
Majority		1,172		
Labour hold		Swing		

=== Maesteg, East and West ===
Maesteg East and West 1931
Party	Candidate	Votes	%	±%
Independent	Albert E. Lockyer	2,863		
Labour	Tom Jenkins	1,746		
Majority		1,117		
Independent hold		Swing		

=== Mountain Ash ===
Mountain Ash 1931
Party	Candidate	Votes	%	±%
Independent	Hon. John H. Bruce*	1,836		
Labour	Justin Lewis	1,727		
Majority		109		
Independent hold		Swing		

=== Neath (North) ===
Neath (North) 1931
Party	Candidate	Votes	%	±%
Independent Liberal	David Griffith Davies	1,382		
Labour	John William Morgan	1,234		
Communist	Frank Roper	77		
Majority		148		
Independent hold		Swing		

=== Neath (South) ===
Neath (South) 1931
Party	Candidate	Votes	%	±%
Labour	Rev W. Degwel Thomas*	1,934		
Independent	Theodore Gibbins	1,907		
Majority		27		
Labour hold		Swing		

=== Newcastle ===
Newcastle 1931
Party	Candidate	Votes	%	±%
Labour	Rev H.R. Protheroe*	Unopposed		
Labour hold		Swing		

=== Ogmore Valley ===
The sitting Independent Labour councillor had recently died.

Ogmore Valley 1931
Party	Candidate	Votes	%	±%
Labour	Thomas Lucas	2,337		
Independent	Thomas Llewellyn	2,152		
Majority		349		
Labour gain from Independent Labour		Swing		

=== Penarth North ===
Penarth North 1931
Party	Candidate	Votes	%	±%
Independent	Frank L. Nicholls	1,261		
Labour	Ernest Edwards	615		
Majority		646		
Independent gain from Labour		Swing		

=== Penarth South ===
Penarth South 1931
Party	Candidate	Votes	%	±%
Independent	Samuel Thomas*	Unopposed		
Independent hold		Swing		

=== Pencoed ===
The sitting member, W.A. Howell, switched to contest the Porthcawl ward and Labour won the seat.

Pencoed 1931
Party	Candidate	Votes	%	±%
Labour	Mervyn W. Paine	1,819		
Independent	David Bayliss	938		
Majority		881		
Labour gain from Independent		Swing		

=== Penrhiwceiber ===
Penrhiwceiber 1931
Party	Candidate	Votes	%	±%
Labour	John William Bath	3,130		
Independent	Mrs Alice Phillips	1,343		
Majority		1,787		
Labour hold		Swing		

=== Pentre ===
Pentre 1931
Party	Candidate	Votes	%	±%
Labour	James Jenkin Lewis	2,061		
Independent	Thomas Alfred Thomas*	1,208		
Majority		853		
Labour gain from Independent		Swing		

=== Pontardawe ===
Pontardawe 1931
Party	Candidate	Votes	%	±%
Labour	David Daniel Davies**	2,787		
Independent	Rev T.M. Roderick	1,342		
Majority		1,445		
Labour gain from Independent		Swing		

=== Pontyclun ===
Pontyclun 1931
Party	Candidate	Votes	%	±%
Labour	Johnson Miles	2,093		
Independent	Rev. Benjamin Salmon	1,778		
Majority		315		
Labour gain from Independent		Swing		

=== Port Talbot East ===
Port Talbot East 1931
Party	Candidate	Votes	%	±%
Labour	John Thomas**	1,481		
Independent	William Arthur Davies	1,226		
Majority		255		
Labour hold		Swing		

=== Port Talbot West ===
Port Talbot West 1931
Party	Candidate	Votes	%	±%
Independent	Llewelyn David*	Unopposed		
Independent hold		Swing		

=== Porthcawl ===
Porthcawl 1931
Party	Candidate	Votes	%	±%
Independent	W.A. Howell*	2,277		
Labour	Jenkin Jones	1,414		
Majority		863		
Independent hold		Swing		

=== Pontlottyn ===
Pontlottyn 1931
Party	Candidate	Votes	%	±%
Labour	W.A. Hancock*	Unopposed		
Labour hold		Swing		

=== Pontycymmer ===
Pontycymmer 1931
Party	Candidate	Votes	%	±%
Labour	Ted Williams*	Unopposed		
Labour hold		Swing		

=== Pontypridd Town ===
Pontypridd Town 1931
Party	Candidate	Votes	%	±%
Independent	Gwilym Seaton	1,438		
Labour	Myra O'Brien	1,407		
Majority		29		
Independent hold		Swing		

=== Penygraig ===
Penygraig 1931
Party	Candidate	Votes	%	±%
Labour	William Job	2,019		
Independent	John Picton Davies*	1,378		
Communist	Vivian Howard James	231		
Majority		641		
Labour gain from Independent		Swing		

=== Porth ===
Porth 1931
Party	Candidate	Votes	%	±%
Independent	William Evans*	Unopposed		
Independent hold		Swing		

=== Swansea Valley ===
Swansea Valley 1931
Party	Candidate	Votes	%	±%
Labour	David Jenkins	2,903		
Independent	Richard Thomas*	2,058		
Majority		945		
Labour gain from Independent		Swing		

=== Tonyrefail and Gilfach Goch ===
Tonyrefail and Gilfach Goch 1931
Party	Candidate	Votes	%	±%
Labour	James Dicks*	Unopposed		
Labour hold		Swing		

=== Trealaw ===
Trealaw 1931
Party	Candidate	Votes	%	±%
Labour	John Atkins	1,649		
Independent	Edwin Jenkins	993		
Communist	John James Townsend	213		
Majority		656		
Labour hold		Swing		

=== Treforest ===
Treforest 1931
Party	Candidate	Votes	%	±%
Labour	Arthur James Chick*	2,104		
Independent	Zenos Thomas	1,968		
Majority		136		
Labour hold		Swing		

=== Treherbert ===
Treherbert 1931
Party	Candidate	Votes	%	±%
Labour	David Edward Williams*	2,674		
Independent	Frederick George Dingley	715		
Majority		1,959		
Labour hold		Swing		

=== Treorchy ===
Treorchy 1931
Party	Candidate	Votes	%	±%
Labour	David Hughes*	Unopposed		
Labour hold		Swing		

=== Tylorstown ===
Tylorstown 1931
Party	Candidate	Votes	%	±%
Labour	David Lewis**	1,907		
Communist	George Edward Maslin	872		
Majority		935		
Labour hold		Swing		

=== Vale of Neath ===
Vale of Neath 1931
Party	Candidate	Votes	%	±%
Labour	William A. Betty*	3,169		
Independent	Rees Howells	2.229		
Communist	W.J. Sherlock	129		
Majority		940		
Labour hold		Swing		

=== Ynyshir ===
Ynyshir 1931
Party	Candidate	Votes	%	±%
Independent	Daniel Jones	1,744		
Labour	Thomas Henry Matthews	1,594		
Majority		150		
Independent gain from Labour		Swing		

=== Ystalyfera ===
Ystalyfera 1931
Party	Candidate	Votes	%	±%
Labour	Daniel T. Jones*	Unopposed		
Labour hold		Swing		

=== Ystrad ===
Ystrad 1931
Party	Candidate	Votes	%	±%
Labour	Sidney Cadogan*	2,417		
Independent	Henry Harris	951		
Majority		1,466		
Labour hold		Swing		

== Election of Aldermen ==
In addition to the 66 councillors the council consisted of 22 county aldermen. Aldermen were elected by the council, and served a six-year term. Following the 1931 election, there were eleven Aldermanic vacancies, and the retiring aldermen were all re-elected.

The following retiring aldermen were re-elected:

- William Bowen (Lab, Llanfabon)
- David Daniel Davies (Lab, Pontardawe)
- Rose Davies (Lab, Aberaman)
- John Evans (Lab, Maesteg)
- Johnson Dicks (Lab, Abercynon)
- E.H. Fleming (Lab, Hopkinstown)
- William Jenkins (Lab, Glyncorrwg)
- Caradoc Jones (Lab, Llandeilo Talybont)
- David Lewis (Lab, Tylorstown)
- John Thomas (Lab, Port Talbot)
- Rev D.H. Williams (Ind, Barry)

== By-elections ==
Eleven vacancies were caused by the election of aldermen.

=== Aberaman by-election ===
Aberaman by-election 1931
Party	Candidate	Votes	%	±%
Labour	Sydney Herbert Stephens*			
Labour hold		Swing		

=== Abercynon by-election ===
Party	Candidate	Votes	%	±%
Labour				
Independent				
Majority				
Labour gain from Independent		Swing		

=== Barry by-election ===
Barry by-election 1931
Party	Candidate	Votes	%	±%
Independent	L.P. Griffiths	2,032		
Labour	Rev R.H. Lomas	1,624		
Majority		408		
Independent gain from Labour		Swing		

=== Glyncorrwg by-election ===
Party	Candidate	Votes	%	±%
Labour				
Independent				
Majority				
Labour gain from Independent		Swing		

=== Hopkinstown by-election ===
Party	Candidate	Votes	%	±%
Labour				
Independent				
Majority				
Labour gain from Independent		Swing		

=== Llandeilo Talybont by-election ===
Llandeilo Talybont
Party	Candidate	Votes	%	±%
Independent	Llewellyn Davies	1,501		
Labour	J. Powell	1,378		
Majority				
Independent gain from Labour		Swing		

=== Llanfabon by-election ===
Llanfabon by-election 1931
Party	Candidate	Votes	%	±%
Labour	Charles Herbert Davies	1,212		
Independent	William Jones	1,169		
Majority		43		
Labour hold		Swing		

=== Maesteg by-election ===
Party	Candidate	Votes	%	±%
Labour				
Independent				
Majority				
Labour gain from Independent		Swing		

=== Pontardawe by-election ===
Pontardawe by-election 1925
Party	Candidate	Votes	%	±%
Labour	Charles Williams	Unopposed		
Labour hold		Swing		

=== Port Talbot by-election ===
Party	Candidate	Votes	%	±%
Labour				
Independent				
Majority				
Labour gain from Independent		Swing		

=== Tylorstown by-election ===
Tylorstown by-election 1931
Party	Candidate	Votes	%	±%
Labour	John Mardy Evans*	1,977		
Communist	George Edward Maslin	584		
Independent	David John	284		
Majority		1,393		
Labour hold		Swing		

== Bibliography ==
- Williams, Chris (1996). Democratic Rhondda: Politics and society 1885-1951. Cardiff: University of Wales Press.
