= 1922 Glamorgan County Council election =

1922 Welsh local government election

The 1922 Glamorgan County Council election to Glamorgan County Council, south Wales, took place in March 1922. It was preceded by the 1919 election and followed by the 1925 election.

== Overview of the result ==
By the early 1920s, the Labour Party was making significant progress in Glamorgan, capturing the majority of the parliamentary constituencies. This was reflected in the county council elections of 1919, when Labour with 40 out of 66 councillors and 11 of the 22 aldermen secured a majority on the County Council for the first time. In 1922 it suffered a minor setback, causing the Western Mail to gleefully report that the party had been "routed once again" owing to a number of individual losses. However, Labour still had a commanding majority following the election.

== Boundary changes ==
There were no boundary changes but some wards were given different names to those used in 1919. Garw Valley ward was known in 1922 as Pontycymmer and the Llantrisant ward as Pontyclun. Margam ward appears to have been divided into two, named Port Talbot East and Port Talbot West.

== Candidates ==
At least 32 candidates were returned unopposed.

A number of retiring aldermen sought re-election. W.H. Davies (Lib, Cilfynydd), Hopkin Morgan (Lib, Neath North) and the Rev William Saunders (Lab, Garw Valley) were returned unopposed.

== Contested elections ==
At least 32 councillors were returned unopposed. Most of the contested elections featured a Labour candidate facing one opponent, whether Conservative, Liberal or Independent. In the Ogmore Valley ward an unusual situation arose where two Labour candidates faced each other, with the railwaymen opposing the nominated candidate of the SWMF

== Outcome ==
In contrast to the 1919 election, Labour suffered a minor setback at the election with a net loss of four seats. Several of these were high-profile contests. At Bargoed, Walter Lewis failed to hold the seat recently vacated by Morgan Jones when he was elected MP for Caerphilly. At Mountain Ash, the wartime pacifist Emrys Hughes failed to dislodge the sitting Liberal councillor while prominent miners' leaders Meth Jones and Ted Williams fell short at Port Talbot and Bridgend respectively. Labour also lost the Gower seat which was a surprise gain three years earlier. Overall, however, Labour was still in the ascendancy.

== Ward results ==
=== Aberaman ===
Aberaman 1922
Party	Candidate	Votes	%	±%
Liberal	Thomas Luther Davies**	Unopposed		
Liberal hold		Swing		

=== Aberavon ===
Aberavon 1922
Party	Candidate	Votes	%	±%
Labour	Edward Lewis Hare*	1,334		
Ratepayers	Andrew Scott	1,035		
Majority		299		
Labour hold		Swing		

=== Abercynon ===
Abercynon 1922
Party	Candidate	Votes	%	±%
Liberal	Dr J. Llewelyn Morris*	2,410		
Ind. Labour Party	Emrys Hughes	1,723		
Majority		687		
Liberal hold		Swing		

=== Aberdare Town ===
Aberdare Town 1922
Party	Candidate	Votes	%	±%
Liberal	Frederick William Mander*	Unopposed		
Liberal hold		Swing		

=== Bargoed ===
Walter Lewis failed to hold the seat previously held by Morgan Jones MP.

Bargoed 1922
Party	Candidate	Votes	%	±%
Independent	Dr B.H.E. McCrae	998		
Labour	Walter Lewis	913		
Majority		85		
Independent gain from Labour		Swing		

=== Barry ===
Barry 1922
Party	Candidate	Votes	%	±%
Labour	J.C. Finch*	Unopposed		
Majority				
Labour hold		Swing		

=== Barry Dock ===
Barry Dock 1922
Party	Candidate	Votes	%	±%
Liberal	W.M. Davies*	Unopposed		
Majority				
Liberal hold		Swing		

=== Blaengwawr ===
Blaengwawr 1922
Party	Candidate	Votes	%	±%
Liberal	Gwilym Alexander Treharne*	Unopposed		
Liberal hold		Swing		

=== Bridgend ===
Bridgend 1922
Party	Candidate	Votes	%	±%
Independent	D Llewellyn Powell	1,863		
Labour	Ted Williams	527		
Majority				
Independent hold		Swing		

=== Briton Ferry ===
Briton Ferry 1922
Party	Candidate	Votes	%	±%
Conservative	M.G. Roberts	1,791		
Labour	Joseph Branch*	1,342		
Majority		449		
Conservative gain from Labour		Swing		

=== Cadoxton ===
Cadoxton 1922
Party	Candidate	Votes	%	±%
Conservative	J.R. Llewellyn*	Unopposed		
Majority				
Conservative hold		Swing		

=== Caerphilly ===
Caerphilly 1922
Party	Candidate	Votes	%	±%
Independent	Thomas Edwards*	1,736		
Labour	Evan Phillips	1,250		
Majority				
Independent hold		Swing		

=== Cilfynydd ===
Cilfynydd 1922
Party	Candidate	Votes	%	±%
Liberal	William Roberts Davies**	Unopposed		
Liberal hold		Swing		

=== Coedffranc ===
Coedffranc 1922
Party	Candidate	Votes	%	±%
Conservative	Dr W.D. Lewis Jones*	1,232		
Independent	W. Phillip Jenkins	1,230		
Majority		2		
Conservative hold		Swing		

=== Coity ===
Coity 1922
Party	Candidate	Votes	%	±%
Independent	W.A. Howell*	Unopposed		
Independent hold		Swing		

=== Cowbridge ===
Cowbridge 1922
Party	Candidate	Votes	%	±%
Conservative	Colonel H.R. Homfray*	Unopposed		
Conservative hold		Swing		

=== Cwm Aber ===
Cwm Aber 1922
Party	Candidate	Votes	%	±%
Labour	Hubert Jenkins**	Unopposed		
Majority				
Labour hold		Swing		

=== Cwmavon ===
Cwmavon 1922
Party	Candidate	Votes	%	±%
Labour	John Jones Edwards*	Unopposed		
Majority				
Labour hold		Swing		

=== Cymmer ===
Morgan Williams held the seat he had represented for twenty years without opposition.

Cymmer 1922
Party	Candidate	Votes	%	±%
Liberal	Morgan Williams*	Unopposed		
Liberal hold		Swing		

=== Dinas Powys ===
Dinas Powys 1922
Party	Candidate	Votes	%	±%
Conservative	Claude D. Thompson*	Unopposed		
Conservative hold		Swing		

=== Dulais Valley ===
Dulais Valley 1922
Party	Candidate	Votes	%	±%
Labour	William Davies*	Unopposed		
Labour hold		Swing		

=== Ferndale ===
Ferndale 1922
Party	Candidate	Votes	%	±%
Labour	Jabez Davies*	Unopposed		
Majority				
Labour hold		Swing		

=== Gadlys ===
Gadlys 1922
Party	Candidate	Votes	%	±%
Independent	T. Marchant Harries	1,584		
Labour	Idwal Thomas*	590		
Majority		994		
Independent gain from Labour		Swing		

=== Glyncorrwg ===
Glyncorrwg 1922
Party	Candidate	Votes	%	±%
Labour	Tom John	1,458		
Independent	Dr Henry Davies*	1,044		
Majority		414		
Labour gain from Independent		Swing		

=== Gower ===
Gower 1922
Party	Candidate	Votes	%	±%
Independent	Fredrick William Davies	1,214		
Labour	Charles Bevan*	1,085		
Majority		209		
Independent gain from Labour		Swing		

=== Hengoed ===
Hengoed 1922
Party	Candidate	Votes	%	±%
Liberal	Edward Richards*	1,757		
Labour	Elwyn T. Morgan	792		
Majority		965		
Liberal hold		Swing		

=== Hopkinstown ===
Hopkinstown 1922
Party	Candidate	Votes	%	±%
Labour	J. Tristram*	Unopposed		
Labour hold		Swing		

=== Kibbor ===
Kibbor 1922
Party	Candidate	Votes	%	±%
Conservative	Henry Lewis**	Unopposed		
Conservative hold		Swing		

=== Llandaff ===
Llandaff 1922
Party	Candidate	Votes	%	±%
Conservative	Lewis Lougher	Unopposed		
Conservative hold		Swing		

=== Llandeilo Talybont ===
Llandeilo Talybont 1922
Party	Candidate	Votes	%	±%
Labour	David Geoffrey Williams*	Unopposed		
Majority				
Labour hold		Swing		

=== Llanfabon ===
Llanfabon 1922
Party	Candidate	Votes	%	±%
Labour	John Phillips	1,009		
Independent	H.E. Morgan-Lindsay*	910		
Majority		99		
Labour gain from Independent		Swing		

=== Llwydcoed ===
Llwydcoed 1922
Party	Candidate	Votes	%	±%
Liberal	William Morgan Llewellyn*	Unopposed		
Liberal hold		Swing		

=== Llwynypia ===
Llwynypia and Clydach 1922
Party	Candidate	Votes	%	±%
Liberal	James Evans**	Unopposed		
Liberal hold		Swing		

=== Loughor ===
Loughor 1922
Party	Candidate	Votes	%	±%
Liberal	Thomas J. Thomas	1,108		
Labour	W.M. Moses**	850		
Independent	Albert Harding*	568		
Majority				
Liberal hold		Swing		

=== Maesteg, Caerau and Nantyffyllon ===
Maesteg, Caerau and Nantyffyllon 1922
Party	Candidate	Votes	%	±%
Labour	John Evans*	Unopposed		
Labour hold		Swing		

=== Maesteg, East and West ===
Maesteg East and West 1922
Party	Candidate	Votes	%	±%
Independent	Thomas E. Hopkins	1,457		
Labour	George John*	1,295		
Majority		162		
Independent gain from Labour		Swing		

=== Mountain Ash ===
The ward was known as Duffryn in 1922.

Mountain Ash 1922
Party	Candidate	Votes	%	±%
Liberal	Lord Aberdare	Unopposed		
Liberal hold		Swing		

=== Neath (North) ===
Neath (North) 1922
Party	Candidate	Votes	%	±%
Liberal	Hopkin Morgan**	Unopposed		
Liberal hold		Swing		

=== Neath (South) ===
Neath (South) 1922
Party	Candidate	Votes	%	±%
Liberal	Frederick William Gibbins*	Unopposed		
Liberal hold				

=== Newcastle ===
Newcastle 1922
Party	Candidate	Votes	%	±%
Labour	E.H. Mole*	Unopposed		
Labour hold		Swing		

=== Ogmore Valley ===
Ogmore Valley 1922
Party	Candidate	Votes	%	±%
Labour	David J. Thomas	1,395		
Labour	Thomas A. Job	1,392		
Majority		3		
Labour gain from Independent		Swing		

=== Penarth North ===
Penarth North 1904
Party	Candidate	Votes	%	±%
Conservative	Rev E.S. Roberts	387		
Liberal	Jenkin Llewellyn	385		
Majority		2		
Conservative hold		Swing		

=== Penarth South ===
Penarth South
Party	Candidate	Votes	%	±%
	Frederick Henry Jotham	unopposed		

=== Penrhiwceiber ===
Penrhiwceiber 1922
Party	Candidate	Votes	%	±%
Liberal	Dr. Ben Phillips-Jones*	Unopposed		
Liberal hold		Swing		

=== Pentre ===
Pentre 1922
Party	Candidate	Votes	%	±%
Liberal	Thomas Alfred Thomas*	1,366		
Labour	J.T. Rees	1,198		
Majority		168		
Liberal hold		Swing		

=== Pontardawe ===
Pontardawe 1922
Party	Candidate	Votes	%	±%
Labour	David Daniel Davies*	Unopposed		
Labour hold		Swing		

=== Pontyclun ===
Pontyclun 1922
Party	Candidate	Votes	%	±%
Conservative	Thomas Jenkins*	1,718		
Labour	D. Harris	623		
Majority		1,095		
Conservative hold		Swing		

=== Port Talbot East ===
The ward was known as Margam North and Central in 1922.

Port Talbot East 1922
Party	Candidate	Votes	%	±%
Labour	John Thomas*	Unopposed		
Labour hold		Swing		

=== Port Talbot West ===
The ward was known as Margam West in 1922.

Port Talbot West 1922
Party	Candidate	Votes	%	±%
Ratepayers	William Arthur Davies	1,311		
Labour	Meth Jones	672		
Majority		639		
Ratepayers hold		Swing		

=== Porthcawl ===
Porthcawl 1922
Party	Candidate	Votes	%	±%
Coalition Unionist	Sir T.G. Jones*	1,338		
Labour	Jenkin Jones	899		
Majority		429		
Conservative hold		Swing		

=== Pontlottyn ===
No nominations were received for this ward where William Hammond (Lab) was the retiring member.

=== Pontycymmer ===
The sitting councillor, Jonathan Maddocks (Ind) withdrew, allowing the retiring Labour alderman to be returned unopposed.

Pontycymmer 1922
Party	Candidate	Votes	%	±%
Labour	Rev William Saunders**	Unopposed		
Majority				
Labour hold		Swing		

=== Pontypridd ===
Pontypridd 1922
Party	Candidate	Votes	%	±%
Labour	Fleming	602		
Liberal	James Roberts*	398		
Conservative	H.M. Gregory	383		
Majority		204		
Labour gain from Liberal		Swing		

=== Penygraig ===
Penygraig 1922
Party	Candidate	Votes	%	±%
Labour	Nefydd Thomas	Unopposed		
Labour hold		Swing		

=== Porth ===
Porth 1922
Party	Candidate	Votes	%	±%
Liberal	William Evans*	Unopposed		
Majority				
Liberal hold		Swing		

=== Swansea Valley ===
Swansea Valley 1922
Party	Candidate	Votes	%	±%
Labour	D.T. Williams*	Unopposed		
Majority				
Labour gain from Progressive		Swing		

=== Tonyrefail and Gilfach Goch ===
Tonyrefail and Gilfach Goch 1922
Party	Candidate	Votes	%	±%
Labour	William Arthur Jones*	1,496		
Independent	Morgan Lloyd Griffiths	882		
Independent	Levi Morgan	191		
Majority		614		
Labour hold		Swing		

=== Trealaw ===
Trealaw 1922
Party	Candidate	Votes	%	±%
Labour	Enoch Treharne	Unopposed		
Majority				
Labour gain from Liberal		Swing		

=== Treforest ===
Treforest 1922
Party	Candidate	Votes	%	±%
Liberal	J.P. Rees**	1,592		
Labour	W.H. May*	828		
Majority		624		
Liberal gain from Labour		Swing		

=== Treherbert ===
Treherbert 1922
Party	Candidate	Votes	%	±%
Liberal	Enoch Davies**	Unopposed		
Liberal hold		Swing		

=== Treorchy ===
Thomas Jones, Co-operative stores manager, was returned unopposed.

Treorchy 1922
Party	Candidate	Votes	%	±%
Liberal	Thomas Jones*	unopposed		
Liberal hold		Swing		

=== Tylorstown ===
Tylorstown 1922
Party	Candidate	Votes	%	±%
Liberal	Dr T.H. Morris*	Unopposed		
Liberal hold		Swing		

=== Vale of Neath ===
Vale of Neath 1922
Party	Candidate	Votes	%	±%
Independent	D.H. Jones	2,381		
Labour	John Davies	1,571		
Majority		810		
Independent gain from Liberal		Swing		

=== Ynyshir ===
Ynyshir 1922
Party	Candidate	Votes	%	±%
Labour	George Dalling*	996		
Independent Labour	William Thomas	985		
Liberal	D. Lewis Daniel	715		
Majority		11		
Labour hold		Swing		

=== Ystalyfera ===
D.W. Davies regained the seat he lost three years previously.

Ystalyfera 1922
Party	Candidate	Votes	%	±%
Independent	D.W. Davies	1,527		
Labour	Daniel T. Jones*	1,153		
Majority		374		
Independent gain from Labour		Swing		

=== Ystrad (Note: This result can be assumed from previous and subsequent results, and reports from council meetings.) ===
Ystrad 1922
Party	Candidate	Votes	%	±%
Liberal	Dr W.E. Thomas	Unopposed		
Liberal hold		Swing		

== Election of Aldermen ==
In addition to the elected councillors the County Council consisted of 22 county aldermen. Aldermen were elected by the council, and served a six-year term. Following the 1922 election, there were eleven Aldermanic vacancies, which were filled at the annual meeting by re-electing all eleven retiring aldermen.

- Thomas Luther Davies (Lib, Aberaman)
- William Roberts Davies (Lib, Cilfynydd)
- Hubert Jenkins (Lab, Cwm Aber)
- Henry Lewis (Con, Kibbor)
- Hopkin Morgan (Lib, Neath)
- Rev William Saunders (Lab, Garw Valley)
- David Thomas Williams (Lab, Swansea Valley)
- Enoch Davies (Lib, Rhondda)
- James Evans (Lib, Rhondda)
- Morgan Williams (Lib, Rhondda)
- James Norris (Lab, Rhondda)

== By-elections ==
Eleven vacancies were caused by the election of aldermen.

=== Aberaman by-election ===
Party	Candidate	Votes	%	±%
Labour				
Independent				
Majority				
Labour gain from Independent		Swing		

=== Cwm Aber by-election ===
Rev D.M. Jones, who stood down in favour of Alderman Hubert Jenkins, was returned unopposed.

Cwm Aber by-election 1922
Party	Candidate	Votes	%	±%
Labour	Rev David M. Jones	1,884		
Independent	E.S. Williams	1,436		
Majority		448		
Labour hold		Swing		

=== Cilfynydd by-election ===
Party	Candidate	Votes	%	±%
Labour				
Independent				
Majority				
Labour gain from Independent		Swing		

=== Cymmer by-election ===
Party	Candidate	Votes	%	±%
Labour				
Independent				
Majority				
Labour gain from Independent		Swing		

=== Garw Valley by-election ===
Party	Candidate	Votes	%	±%
Labour				
Independent				
Majority				
Labour gain from Independent		Swing		

=== Kibbor by-election ===
H. Spence Thomas, who stood down in favour of Alderman Henry Lewis, was returned unopposed.

Kibbor by-election 1922
Party	Candidate	Votes	%	±%
Independent	H. Spence Thomas			
Majority				
Independent hold		Swing		

=== Llwynypia by-election ===
Party	Candidate	Votes	%	±%
Labour				
Independent				
Majority				
Labour gain from Independent		Swing		

=== Neath North by-election ===
Party	Candidate	Votes	%	±%
Labour				
Independent				
Majority				
Labour gain from Independent		Swing		

=== Rhondda by-election ===
Party	Candidate	Votes	%	±%
Labour				
Independent				
Majority				
Labour gain from Independent		Swing		

=== Swansea Valley by-election ===
Party	Candidate	Votes	%	±%
Labour				
Independent				
Majority				
Labour gain from Independent		Swing		

=== Treherbert by-election ===
Party	Candidate	Votes	%	±%
Labour				
Independent				
Majority				
Labour gain from Independent		Swing		

== Bibliography ==
- Williams, Chris (1996). Democratic Rhondda: Politics and society 1885-1951. Cardiff: University of Wales Press.
