= 1928 Glamorgan County Council election =

1928 Welsh local government election

The thirteenth election to Glamorgan County Council, south Wales, took place in March 1928. It was preceded by the 1925 election and followed by the 1931 election.

== Overview of the result ==
Labour was defending a secure majority in an election that was more bitterly fought than in previous year, in the wake of divisions persisting after the General Strike and lockout of 1926. Non-Labour candidates largely coalesced under an Independent banner but lost further ground as Labour won additional seats

== Boundary changes ==
There were no boundary changes at this election.

== Candidates ==
20 candidates were returned unopposed, only five won whom were Labour.

Following the death of Dr T.H. Morris (Rhondda) there were ten retiring aldermen, nine of whom sought re-election. The only exception was Thomas Luther Davies (Aberaman).

== Contested elections ==
The pattern of contests was similar to 1925, although Labour did challenge some long-serving aldermen including W.R. Davies (first elected in 1898) at Cilfynydd and Enoch Davies in the Rhondda. In the Garw Valley ward, retiring alderman Rev. William Saunders was opposed by the sitting Independent councillor as was Alderman D.T. Williams in the Swansea Valley ward.

== Outcome ==
Labour gained a number of seats, increasing their majority on the County Council.

A notable result in the Dulais Valley was the defeat of coal owner Daniel Daniels, former chairman of the Council, by Labour candidate Gwilym Davies. Daniels had not been re-elected as an alderman three years previously and the result came after a series of disputes in the mining industry.

In the Cilfynydd ward, Labour candidate Arthur Pearson defeated Alderman W.R. Davies, first elected to the council in 1898. Labour had won the seat in 1919 but in 1922 stood down to allow Davies to be returned unopposed. The decision to oppose him reflected the increasingly partisan politics of the mining valleys and Davies was narrowly defeated.

A similar situation arose in Treherbert, a seat won for Labour by D.E. Williams in 1919. Williams stood down in favour of Alderman Enoch Davies in 1922 but having been returned unopposed in 1925 he stood against Davies and was returned by several hundred votes. Enoch Davies had served as a member of the Council since 1901, and was a prominent tradesman and nonconformist.

Labour lost only two seats, at Penygraig in the Rhondda and also Pontardawe. The latter was significant as it was also represented by Alderman Dan Dai Davies, jailed for his role in the anthracite strike and disturbances of 1925. Labour consolidated their majorities in many others, including seats gained three years previously.

== Ward results ==
=== Aberaman ===
Aberaman 1928
Party	Candidate	Votes	%	±%
Labour	Sydney Herbert Stephens*	2,410		
Independent	Augustus Davies	1,681		
Majority		729		
Labour hold		Swing		

=== Aberavon ===
Aberavon 1928
Party	Candidate	Votes	%	±%
Labour	Edward Lewis Hare*	2,369		
Independent	E. Marchant Jenkins	1,984		
Majority		385		
Labour hold		Swing		

=== Abercynon ===
Abercynon 1928
Party	Candidate	Votes	%	±%
Labour	Richard A. Thomas	2,473		
Liberal	Edward J. Thomas	1,579		
Majority		394		
Labour hold		Swing		

=== Aberdare Town ===
Aberdare Town 1928
Party	Candidate	Votes	%	±%
Independent	William Thomas*	Unopposed		
Independent gain from Liberal		Swing		

=== Bargoed ===
Bargoed 1928
Party	Candidate	Votes	%	±%
Labour	William Henry Hopkins*	2,760		
Independent	Gus Jones	1,786		
Majority		974		
Labour hold		Swing		

=== Barry ===
Barry 1928
Party	Candidate	Votes	%	±%
Labour	Rev R.H. Lomas	1,909		
Independent	E.T. Lawrence*	1,669		
Majority		240		
Labour gain from Liberal		Swing		

=== Barry Dock ===
Barry Dock 1928
Party	Candidate	Votes	%	±%
Liberal	W.M. Davies*	2,139		
Independent	P.J. O'Donnell	880		
Majority		1,259		
Liberal hold		Swing		

=== Blaengwawr ===
Blaengwawr 1928
Party	Candidate	Votes	%	±%
Labour	William J. Edwards*	1,541		
Independent	Henry Vause	750		
Majority		791		
Labour hold		Swing		

=== Bridgend ===
Bridgend 1928
Party	Candidate	Votes	%	±%
Independent	Dapho Llewellyn Powell*	Unopposed		
Independent hold		Swing		

=== Briton Ferry ===
Briton Ferry 1928
Party	Candidate	Votes	%	±%
Labour	George Gethin*	1,946		
Independent	W.J. Hill	1,714		
Majority		232		
Labour hold		Swing		

=== Cadoxton ===
Cadoxton 1928
Party	Candidate	Votes	%	±%
Independent	J.R. Llewellyn*	Unopposed		
Majority				
Independent gain from Conservative		Swing		

=== Caerphilly ===
Caerphilly 1928
Party	Candidate	Votes	%	±%
Independent	Thomas Edwards*	2,412		
Labour	Evan Phillips	2,345		
Majority		67		
Independent gain from Liberal		Swing		

=== Cilfynydd ===
Cilfynydd 1928
Party	Candidate	Votes	%	±%
Labour	Arthur Pearson	1,912		
Independent	William Roberts Davies**	1,773		
Majority		139		
Labour hold		Swing		

=== Coedffranc ===
Coedffranc 1928
Party	Candidate	Votes	%	±%
Labour	W. Phillip Jenkins*	2,149		
Independent	Ogley L. David	2,077		
Majority		72		
Labour hold		Swing		

=== Cowbridge ===
Cowbridge 1928
Party	Candidate	Votes	%	±%
Independent	Colonel H.R. Homfray*	2,061		
Labour	David E. Harris	1,132		
Majority		919		
Independent gain from Conservative		Swing		

=== Cwm Aber ===
Cwm Aber 1928
Party	Candidate	Votes	%	±%
Labour	Hubert Jenkins**	Unopposed		
Majority				
Labour hold		Swing		

=== Cwmavon ===
Cwmavon 1928
Party	Candidate	Votes	%	±%
Labour	John Jones Edwards*	1,728		
Independent	Percy Jacob	1,241		
Majority		487		
Labour hold		Swing		

=== Cymmer ===
In 1922 David Watts-Morgan had stood down in favour of retiring Liberal alderman Morgan Williams but by 1928 Williams had retired from public life.

Cymmer 1928
Party	Candidate	Votes	%	±%
Labour	David Watts-Morgan*	1,378		
Independent	Mrs R.D. Chalke	925		
Majority		453		
Labour hold		Swing		

=== Dinas Powys ===
Dinas Powys 1928
Party	Candidate	Votes	%	±%
Independent	Claude D. Thompson*	Unopposed		
Independent gain from Conservative		Swing		

=== Dulais Valley ===
Dulais Valley 1928
Party	Candidate	Votes	%	±%
Labour	Gwilym Davies	2,338		
Independent	Daniel Daniels*	1,421		
Majority		917		
Labour gain from Liberal		Swing		

=== Ferndale ===
Ferndale 1928
Party	Candidate	Votes	%	±%
Labour	Jabez Davies*	Unopposed		
Labour hold		Swing		

=== Gadlys ===
Gadlys 1928
Party	Candidate	Votes	%	±%
Independent	T. Marchant Harries*	Unopposed		
Independent gain from Liberal		Swing		

=== Glyncorrwg ===
Glyncorrwg 1928
Party	Candidate	Votes	%	±%
Labour	Tom John*	2,135		
Independent	Dr Alfred Davies	1,095		
Majority		1,040		
Labour hold		Swing		

=== Gower ===
Gower 1928
Party	Candidate	Votes	%	±%
Independent	Frederick W. Davies*	2,041		
Labour	William Henry Davies	1,534		
Majority		407		
Independent hold		Swing		

=== Hengoed ===
Hengoed 1928
Party	Candidate	Votes	%	±%
Labour	Thomas Evans	1,810		
Independent	Edward Richards*	1,466		
Majority		344		
Labour gain from Liberal		Swing		

=== Hopkinstown ===
Hopkinstown 1928
Party	Candidate	Votes	%	±%
Labour	John Tristram*			
Independent	W.E. Summers	1,131		
Majority		701		
Labour hold		Swing		

=== Kibbor ===
Kibbor 1928
Party	Candidate	Votes	%	±%
Independent	H. Spence Thomas*	2,501		
Labour	W.S. Collins	857		
Majority		1,644		
Independent gain from Conservative		Swing		

=== Llandaff ===
Llandaff 1928
Party	Candidate	Votes	%	±%
Independent	Lewis Lougher*	Unopposed		
Independent gain from Conservative		Swing		

=== Llandeilo Talybont ===
Llandeilo Talybont 1928
Party	Candidate	Votes	%	±%
Labour	Thomas Jones	2,086		
Independent	Ben Oliver	1,437		
Majority		649		
Labour hold		Swing		

=== Llanfabon ===
Llanfabon 1928
Party	Candidate	Votes	%	±%
Labour	William Bowen*	1,502		
Independent	Arthur Hopkins	1,037		
Majority		465		
Labour hold		Swing		

=== Llwydcoed ===
Llwydcoed 1928
Party	Candidate	Votes	%	±%
Independent	Martha Emma Jones	Unopposed		
Independent gain from Liberal		Swing		

=== Llwynypia ===
Llwynypia 1928
Party	Candidate	Votes	%	±%
Independent	James Evans**	Unopposed		
Independent gain from Liberal		Swing		

=== Loughor ===
Loughor 1928
Party	Candidate	Votes	%	±%
Independent	Thomas J. Thomas*	Unopposed		
Independent hold		Swing		

=== Maesteg, Caerau and Nantyffyllon ===
Maesteg, Caerau and Nantyffyllon 1928
Party	Candidate	Votes	%	±%
Labour	John Hughes*	Unopposed		
Labour hold		Swing		

=== Maesteg, East and West ===
Maesteg East and West 1928
Party	Candidate	Votes	%	±%
Independent	Albert E. Lockyer	2,471		
Labour	George Hitchings	1,129		
Majority		1,612		
Independent hold		Swing		

=== Mountain Ash ===
Mountain Ash 1928
Party	Candidate	Votes	%	±%
Independent	Lord Aberdare*	Unopposed		
Independent hold		Swing		

=== Neath (North) ===
Neath (North) 1928
Party	Candidate	Votes	%	±%
Independent	Hopkin Morgan**	Unopposed		
Independent gain from Liberal		Swing		

=== Neath (South) ===
Davies failed to hold Neath South having stood down in favour of Alderman Hopkin Morgan in neighbouring Neath North.

Neath (South) 1928
Party	Candidate	Votes	%	±%
Labour	Rev W. Degwel Thomas	1,880		
Independent	David Griffith Davies*	1,714		
Majority		175		
Labour gain from Liberal		Swing		

=== Newcastle ===
Newcastle 1928
Party	Candidate	Votes	%	±%
Labour	Edward Horace Mole*	Unopposed		
Labour hold		Swing		

=== Ogmore Valley ===
Six years previously, the SWMF candidate had defeated a railwaymen's nominee but that result was now reversed.

Ogmore Valley 1928
Party	Candidate	Votes	%	±%
Independent Labour	Thomas A. Job	2,157		
Labour	David J. Thomas*	1,808		
Majority		349		
Independent Labour gain from Labour		Swing		

=== Penarth North ===
Penarth North 1928
Party	Candidate	Votes	%	±%
Labour	Peter Freeman	802		
Independent	Walter Hallett*	801		
Majority		1		
Labour gain from Conservative		Swing		

=== Penarth South ===
Penarth South 1928
Party	Candidate	Votes	%	±%
Independent	Samuel Thomas*	Unopposed		
Independent gain from Conservative		Swing		

=== Pencoed ===
Pencoed 1928
Party	Candidate	Votes	%	±%
Independent	W.A. Howell*	Unopposed		
Independent hold		Swing		

=== Penrhiwceiber ===
Penrhiwceiber 1928
Party	Candidate	Votes	%	±%
Labour	John William Bath	Unopposed		
Labour hold		Swing		

=== Pentre ===
Pentre 1928
Party	Candidate	Votes	%	±%
Independent	Thomas Alfred Thomas*	Unopposed		
Independent gain from Liberal		Swing		

=== Pontardawe ===
Pontardawe 1928
Party	Candidate	Votes	%	±%
Independent	C. Gilbertson	2,150		
Labour	Charles Williams*	1,986		
Majority		164		
Independent gain from Labour		Swing		

=== Pontyclun ===
Pontyclun 1928
Party	Candidate	Votes	%	±%
Independent	Thomas Jenkins*	1,949		
Labour	Johnson Miles	1,636		
Majority		313		
Independent gain from Conservative		Swing		

=== Port Talbot East ===
Port Talbot East 1928
Party	Candidate	Votes	%	±%
Labour	Taliesin Mainwaring	1,461		
Independent	William Arthur Davies	1,363		
Majority		98		
Labour hold		Swing		

=== Port Talbot West ===
Port Talbot West 1928
Party	Candidate	Votes	%	±%
Independent	Llewelyn David*	1,778		
Labour	Joseph Brown	1,020		
Majority		758		
Independent hold		Swing		

=== Porthcawl ===
Porthcawl 1928
Party	Candidate	Votes	%	±%
Independent	William Elias	2,585		
Labour	William J. Owen	1,626		
Majority		959		
Independent hold		Swing		

=== Pontlottyn ===
Hammond had previously been elected as a Liberal.

Pontlottyn 1928
Party	Candidate	Votes	%	±%
Labour	William Hammond*	1,683		
Independent	A.E. Gardner	552		
Majority		1,131		
Labour hold		Swing		

=== Pontycymmer ===
Pontycymmer 1928
Party	Candidate	Votes	%	±%
Labour	Rev. William Saunders**	2,260		
Independent	Jonathan Maddocks*	1,519		
Majority		741		
Labour gain from Independent		Swing		

=== Pontypridd Town ===
Pontypridd Town 1928
Party	Candidate	Votes	%	±%
Independent	H.R. Evans*	1,651		
Labour	D.L. Davies	1,127		
Majority		524		
Independent hold		Swing		

=== Penygraig ===
Penygraig 1928
Party	Candidate	Votes	%	±%
Independent	J.P. Davies	1,680		
Labour	Nefydd Thomas*	1,628		
Majority		52		
Independent gain from Labour		Swing		

=== Porth ===
Porth 1928
Party	Candidate	Votes	%	±%
Independent	William Evans*	Unopposed		
Independent gain from Liberal		Swing		

=== Swansea Valley ===
Swansea Valley 1928
Party	Candidate	Votes	%	±%
Labour	D.T. Williams**	2,596		
Independent	Richard Thomas*	2,042		
Independent	Mrs E. Jones	363		
Majority		554		
Labour gain from Independent		Swing		

=== Tonyrefail and Gilfach Goch ===
Tonyrefail and Gilfach Goch 1928
Party	Candidate	Votes	%	±%
Labour	William Arthur Jones*	1,646		
Independent	E.W. Evans	1,535		
Majority		111		
Labour hold		Swing		

=== Trealaw ===
Trealaw 1928
Party	Candidate	Votes	%	±%
Labour	Enoch Treharne*	1,764		
Independent	Rev T.L. Jones	1,133		
Independent Labour	A. Boyce	1,072		
Majority		631		
Labour hold		Swing		

=== Treforest ===
Treforest 1928
Party	Candidate	Votes	%	±%
Labour	Arthur James Chick*	2,175		
Independent	R. Roper	1,850		
Majority		325		
Labour hold		Swing		

=== Treherbert ===
Enoch Davies was defeated after 27 years after the sitting Labour councillor did not withdraw in his favour

Treherbert 1928
Party	Candidate	Votes	%	±%
Labour	David Edward Williams*	2,426		
Independent	Enoch Davies**	2,019		
Majority		407		
Labour hold		Swing		

=== Treorchy ===
Treorchy 1928
Party	Candidate	Votes	%	±%
Labour	Rhys Evans*	3,118		
Independent	John Samuel	2,316		
Majority		802		
Labour hold		Swing		

=== Tylorstown ===
Tylorstown 1928
Party	Candidate	Votes	%	±%
Labour	John Mardy Evans*	2,060		
Independent	Daniel Ashton	874		
Majority		1,186		
Labour hold		Swing		

=== Vale of Neath ===
Vale of Neath 1928
Party	Candidate	Votes	%	±%
Labour	William A. Betty	2,250		
Independent	D.H. Jones*	2.004		
Majority		46		
Labour gain from Independent		Swing		

=== Ynyshir ===
Ynyshir 1928
Party	Candidate	Votes	%	±%
Labour	George Dalling*	2,145		
Independent	Dan Jones	1,449		
Majority		699		
Labour hold		Swing		

=== Ystalyfera ===
Ystalyfera 1928
Party	Candidate	Votes	%	±%
Labour	John David Brazell*	2,177		
Independent	T. Alex Evans	1,170		
Majority		1,007		
Labour hold		Swing		

=== Ystrad ===
Ystrad 1928
Party	Candidate	Votes	%	±%
Independent	Dr W.E. Thomas*	Unopposed		
Independent gain from Liberal		Swing		

== Election of Aldermen ==
In addition to the 66 councillors the council consisted of 22 county aldermen. Aldermen were elected by the council, and served a six-year term. Following the 1928 election, there were eleven Aldermanic vacancies, all of which all of which were filled by Labour nominees despite the protestations of their opponents.

The following retiring aldermen were re-elected:

- Hubert Jenkins (Lab, Cwm Aber)
- Rev William Saunders (Lab, Garw Valley)
- David Thomas Williams (Lab, Swansea Valley)

In addition, the following seven new aldermen were elected:

- J.D. Brazell (Lab, Ystalyfera)
- Jabez Davies (Lab, Rhondda)
- Rhys Evans (Lab, Treorchy)
- William Hammond (Lab, Pontlottyn)
- W. Arthur Jones (Lab, Tonyrefail)
- E.H. Mole (Lab, Newcastle)
- Enoch Treharne (Lab, Rhondda)
- David Watts-Morgan MP (Lab, Rhondda)

The following retiring aldermen were re-elected as members of the Council but were not re-elected as aldermen:

- Hopkin Morgan (Lib, Neath)
- Enoch Davies (Lib, Rhondda)
- James Evans (Lib, Rhondda)

== By-elections ==
Eleven vacancies were caused by the election of aldermen.

=== Cwm Aber by-election ===
Party	Candidate	Votes	%	±%
Labour				
Independent				
Majority				
Labour gain from Independent		Swing		

=== Cymmer by-election ===
Following the election of David Watts-Morgan as alderman the by-election was won by the Independent candidate. Mrs Chalke was married to R.D. Chalke, headmaster of Porth Grammar School and the prospective Liberal candidate for Rhondda East, when he was due to oppose Watts-Morgan.

Cymmer by-election 1928
Party	Candidate	Votes	%	±%
Independent	Mrs R.D. Chalke	1,068		
Labour	David Thomas	908		
Majority		160		
Independent gain from Labour		Swing		

=== Ferndale by-election ===
Ferndale by-election 1928
Party	Candidate	Votes	%	±%
Independent	Alfred Evans	2,301		
Labour	Dr K. Datta	1,559		
Communist	Charles Jones	1,224		
Majority		742		
Independent gain from Labour		Swing		

=== Garw Valley by-election ===
Jonathan Maddocks, the sitting Independent councillor, had been defeated by Alderman William Saunders at the regular election, and was again defeated by a Labour candidate.

Garw Valley by-election 1928
Party	Candidate	Votes	%	±%
Labour	Ted Williams	2,370		
Independent	Jonathan Maddocks	1,391		
Majority		979		
Labour gain from Independent		Swing		

=== Newcastle by-election ===
Following the appointment of E.H. Mole as alderman, the Rev. H.R. Jenkins, vicar of Penyfai, was elected to represent this ward.

Newcastle by-election 1928
Party	Candidate	Votes	%	±%
Labour	Rev H.R. Jenkins	1,734		
Independent	Thomas Butler	1,252		
Majority		482		
Labour hold		Swing		

=== Pontlottyn by-election ===
Pontlottyn by-election 1928
Party	Candidate	Votes	%	±%
Labour	W.A. Hancock	1,439		
Liberal	Mrs H. Davies	909		
Majority		530		
Labour hold		Swing		

=== Swansea Valley by-election ===
Following the re-election of D.T. Williams as alderman, Richard Thomas, who had held the seat since 1922 but failed to hold on against Williams, regained the seat as an Independent.

Swansea Valley by-election 1928
Party	Candidate	Votes	%	±%
Independent	Richard Thomas	2,547		
Labour	John L. Rees	2,130		
Majority		417		
Independent gain from Labour		Swing		

=== Tonyrefail by-election ===
Party	Candidate	Votes	%	±%
Labour				
Independent				
Majority				
Labour gain from Independent		Swing		

=== Trealaw by-election ===
Trealaw by-election 1928
Party	Candidate	Votes	%	±%
Labour	Rev R.J. Barker	2,022		
Independent Labour	Jack Hughes	1,677		
Majority		350		
Labour hold		Swing		

=== Treorchy by-election ===
Following the election of Rhys Evans as alderman, David Hughes, checkweigher at Abergorki Colliery was elected as his successor.

Treorchy by-election 1928
Party	Candidate	Votes	%	±%
Labour	David Hughes	2,726		
Independent Labour	J. Davies	1,991		
Majority		737		
Labour hold		Swing		

=== Ystalyfera by-election ===
Following the election of J.D. Brazell as alderman, Daniel T. Jones of Cwmllynfell, who had held the seat from 1919 until 1922 was elected as his successor.

Ystalyfera by-election 1928
Party	Candidate	Votes	%	±%
Labour	Daniel T. Jones	1,962		
Independent	John Griffiths	982		
Majority		980		
Labour hold		Swing		

== Bibliography ==
- Williams, Chris (1996). Democratic Rhondda: Politics and society 1885-1951. Cardiff: University of Wales Press.
