= 1919 Glamorgan County Council election =

1919 Welsh local government election

The tenth election to Glamorgan County Council, south Wales, took place in March 1919. It was preceded by the 1913 election and followed by the 1922 election.

== Overview of the result ==
In this first post-war election a significant advance was made by the Labour Party, which captured a number of seats, and established a comfortable majority on the Council for the first time.

== Boundary Changes ==
A number of boundary changes had taken place since the previous election. The extension of the Swansea Borough boundary caused the disappearance of the Llansamlet, Morriston, Sketty, and Oystermouth divisions which were no longer part of the county. Four new divisions were created in other parts of the county. The old Margam division was divided into two (Margam East and Port Talbot West), and the Llantrisant division was likewise divided into two new wards, namely Gilfach Goch and Tonyrefail. Llantwit Fardre, a new division was also created at Hopkinstown, Pontypridd and the old Aber division was divided into the Cwm Aber and Llanfabon divisions. The number of wards remained at 66.

== Candidates ==
38 of the 66 councilors were returned unopposed.

Party	Unopposed Returns
Conservative	8
Labour	10
Liberal	12
Independent	0
Liberal-Labour	1

Most of the re-elected Conservatives represented wards on the outskirts of Cardiff and in the Vale of Glamorgan. Labour candidates were returned unopposed in a number of the mining valleys although sitting Liberals were also unopposed in some of these localities.

Of the eleven retiring aldermen, seven sought re-election to the Council. Three of these namely E.H. Fleming (Lab, Hopkinstown), William Jones (Lab, Mountain Ash) and William Llewellyn (Lib, Ogmore Vale) were returned unopposed.

== Contested Elections ==
Many of the contested elections resulted in the decision of the Labour Party to run more candidates than ever before. The distribution of these candidates was not uniform, with candidates being run in all Rhondda wards bar two (where two long-serving Liberals went unopposed). In contrast there was only one contested elections in the Aberdare district, and this was more personal than political. Despite the Labour advance at district level in the pre-war period they fielded no candidates.

== Outcome ==
A number of seats changed hands as Labour captured twelve seats and lost only one. Most attention focused on the defeat of two members who had served since 1889, namely Alderman J.M. Smith (Aberavon) and Alderman W.H. Mathias (Rhondda) lost to Labour challengers, but Labour victories occurred in most parts of the county . A third retiring alderman, Evan Davies (Lib, Maesteg) was also defeated while the Rev D.H. Williams (Lib, Barry) sought off a Labour challenger.

== Ward results ==
=== Aberaman ===
Aberaman 1919
Party	Candidate	Votes	%	±%
Liberal	Thomas Lewis	Unopposed		
Liberal hold		Swing		

=== Aberavon ===
Aberavon 1919
Party	Candidate	Votes	%	±%
Labour	David Rees	1,016		
Conservative	John Morgan Smith**	1,010		
Labour gain from Conservative		Swing		

=== Abercynon ===
Abercynon 1919
Party	Candidate	Votes	%	±%
Liberal	Dr I. Llewelyn Morris*	Unopposed		
Liberal hold		Swing		

=== Aberdare Town ===
Aberdare Town 1919
Party	Candidate	Votes	%	±%
Liberal	William Thomas*	Unopposed		
Liberal hold		Swing		

=== Bargoed ===
Bargoed 1919
Party	Candidate	Votes	%	±%
Liberal	Rev D. Leyshon Evans*	1,460		
Labour	Morgan Jones	1,146		
Majority		314		
Liberal hold		Swing		

=== Barry ===
Barry 1919
Party	Candidate	Votes	%	±%
Liberal	Rev D.H. Williams**	901		
Labour	Dr C.E.G. Sixsmith	406		
Majority		495		
Liberal hold		Swing		

=== Barry Dock ===
Barry Dock 1919
Party	Candidate	Votes	%	±%
Liberal	W.M. Davies*	774		
Labour	Rev Ingli James	268		
Majority		506		
Liberal hold		Swing		

=== Blaengwawr ===
Blaengwawr 1919
Party	Candidate	Votes	%	±%
Liberal	Gwilym Alexander Treharne*	Unopposed		
Liberal hold		Swing		

=== Bridgend ===
Bridgend 1919
Party	Candidate	Votes	%	±%
Conservative	John Morgan Randall*	Unopposed		
Conservative hold		Swing		

=== Briton Ferry ===
Briton Ferry 1919
Party	Candidate	Votes	%	±%
Labour	Joseph Branch	1,063		
Liberal	James Morris	987		
Majority		76		
Labour gain from Liberal		Swing		

=== Cadoxton ===
Cadoxton 1919
Party	Candidate	Votes	%	±%
Conservative	J.R. Llewellyn*	Unopposed		
Majority				
Conservative hold		Swing		

=== Caerphilly ===
Caerphilly 1919
Party	Candidate	Votes	%	±%
Liberal	Joseph Howells*	1,304		
Labour	Claude Denscombe	896		
Majority		408		
Liberal hold		Swing		

=== Cilfynydd ===
Cilfynydd 1919
Party	Candidate	Votes	%	±%
Labour	Daniel Rees	1,294		
Liberal	J.E. Brooks	689		
Majority		685		
Labour hold		Swing		

=== Coedffranc ===
Coedffranc 1919
Party	Candidate	Votes	%	±%
Conservative	Dr W.D. Lewis Jones	936		
Labour	T.W. Davies*	689		
Labour	John Rees	430		
Majority		247		
Conservative gain from Labour		Swing		

=== Coity ===
Coity 1919
Party	Candidate	Votes	%	±%
Independent	W.A. Howell	1,242		
Liberal	John Rees*	395		
Majority		847		
Independent gain from Liberal		Swing		

=== Cowbridge ===
Cowbridge 1919
Party	Candidate	Votes	%	±%
Conservative	Colonel H.R. Homfray*			
Labour	Kenneth James			
Majority				
Conservative hold		Swing		

=== Cwm Aber ===
Cwm Aber 1919
Party	Candidate	Votes	%	±%
Labour	Hubert Jenkins*	Unopposed		
Majority				
Labour hold		Swing		

=== Cwmavon ===
Cwmavon 1919
Party	Candidate	Votes	%	±%
Labour	John Jones Edwards	1,135		
Conservative	John Hanbury	563		
Independent	Yilliam McNeil	289		
Majority		572		
Labour gain from Independent		Swing		

=== Cymmer ===
Cymmer 1919
Party	Candidate	Votes	%	±%
Labour	David Watts-Morgan*	1,343		
Independent	D. Roberts Powell	301		
Majority		1,042		
Labour hold		Swing		

=== Dinas Powys ===
Dinas Powys 1919
Party	Candidate	Votes	%	±%
Conservative	Claude D. Thompson*	Unopposed		
Conservative hold		Swing		

=== Dulais Valley ===
Dulais Valley 1919
Party	Candidate	Votes	%	±%
Liberal	Daniel Daniels*	Unopposed		
Liberal hold		Swing		

=== Ferndale ===
Ferndale 1919
Party	Candidate	Votes	%	±%
Labour	John Davies	Unopposed		
Labour hold		Swing		

=== Gadlys ===
The sitting member was heavily defeated by the minister of Tabernacle, Aberdare.

Gadlys 1919
Party	Candidate	Votes	%	±%
Liberal	Rev T. Madoc Jeffreys	841		
Liberal	T. Walter Williams*	272		
Majority		569		
Liberal hold		Swing		

=== Garw Valley ===
Garw Valley 1919
Party	Candidate	Votes	%	±%
Lib-Lab	Rev William Saunders*	Unopposed		
Majority				
Lib-Lab hold		Swing		

=== Glyncorrwg ===
Glyncorrwg 1919
Party	Candidate	Votes	%	±%
Labour	William Jenkins*	Unopposed		
Labour hold				

=== Gower ===
Gower 1919
Party	Candidate	Votes	%	±%
Labour	W.H. Davies	1,126		
Independent	George E. Gordon*	586		
Majority		540		
Labour gain from Conservative		Swing		

=== Hengoed ===
Hengoed 1919
Party	Candidate	Votes	%	±%
Liberal	Edward Richards*	1,343		
Conservative	William James Price	615		
Majority		728		
Liberal hold		Swing		

=== Hopkinstown ===
Hopkinstown 1919
Party	Candidate	Votes	%	±%
Labour	E.H. Fleming**	Unopposed		
Labour hold		Swing		

=== Kibbor ===
Kibbor 1919
Party	Candidate	Votes	%	±%
Conservative	H. Spence Thomas	Unopposed		
Conservative hold		Swing		

=== Llandaff ===
Llandaff 1919
Party	Candidate	Votes	%	±%
Conservative	William Forrest	Unopposed		
Conservative hold		Swing		

=== Llandeilo Talybont ===
Llandeilo Talybont 1919
Party	Candidate	Votes	%	±%
Labour	David Geoffrey Williams	850		
Independent	Albert Morgan	554		
Majority		296		
Labour gain from Conservative		Swing		

=== Llanfabon ===
Llanfabon 1919
Party	Candidate	Votes	%	±%
Conservative	H.E. Morgan Lindsay	997		
Labour	David Bouldin	559		
Majority		348		
Conservative win (new seat)				

=== Llantrisant ===
Llantrisant 1919
Party	Candidate	Votes	%	±%
Conservative	Thomas Jenkins	733		
Labour	Tom Young	711		
Liberal	George Thomas Davies*	581		
Majority		22		
Conservative win (new seat)				

=== Llwydcoed ===
Llwydcoed 1919
Party	Candidate	Votes	%	±%
Liberal	William Morgan Llewellyn	unopposed		
Liberal hold		Swing		

=== Llwynypia ===
Llwynypia 1919
Party	Candidate	Votes	%	±%
Labour	John Hammond	Unopposed		
Labour hold		Swing		

=== Loughor ===
Loughor 1919
Party	Candidate	Votes	%	±%
Independent	Albert Harding	Unopposed		
Independent hold		Swing		

=== Maesteg, Caerau and Nantyffyllon ===
Maesteg, Caerau and Nantyffyllon 1919
Party	Candidate	Votes	%	±%
Labour	John Evans*	Unopposed		
Majority				
Labour hold		Swing		

=== Maesteg, East and West ===
Maesteg East and West 1919
Party	Candidate	Votes	%	±%
Labour	Edwin Barnett	1,852		
Liberal	Evan E. Davies**	769		
Majority		1,063		
Labour gain from Liberal		Swing		

=== Mountain Ash ===
Lord Aberdare was initially nominated but withdrew, allowing retiring alderman William Jones to be returned unopposed.

Mountain Ash 1919
Party	Candidate	Votes	%	±%
Liberal	William Jones**	Unopposed		
Liberal hold		Swing		

=== Neath (North) ===
Neath (North) 1919
Party	Candidate	Votes	%	±%
Progressive	David Griffith Davies	494		
Liberal	J. Morris	365		
Independent	Rev Degwell Thomas	296		
Majority		129		
Progressive hold		Swing		

=== Neath (South) ===
Neath (South) 1919
Party	Candidate	Votes	%	±%
Liberal	Frederick William Gibbins*	Unopposed		
Liberal hold				

=== Newcastle ===
Newcastle 1919
Party	Candidate	Votes	%	±%
Labour	Edward H. Mole	1,613		
Conservative	William H.C. Llewellyn*	1,040		
Majority		573		
Labour gain from Conservative		Swing		

=== Ogmore Valley ===
Ogmore Valley 1919
Party	Candidate	Votes	%	±%
Liberal	William Llewellyn**	Unopposed		
Liberal hold		Swing		

=== Penarth North ===
Penarth North 1919
Party	Candidate	Votes	%	±%
Conservative	Walter Hallett	Unopposed		
Conservative hold		Swing		

=== Penarth South ===
Penarth South 1919
Party	Candidate	Votes	%	±%
Conservative	Samuel Thomas*	Unopposed		
Conservative hold		Swing		

=== Penrhiwceiber ===
Penrhiwceiber 1919
Party	Candidate	Votes	%	±%
Liberal	Dr. Ben Phillips-Jones*	Unopposed		
Liberal hold		Swing		

=== Pentre ===
Pentre 1919
Party	Candidate	Votes	%	±%
Liberal	Thomas Alfred Thomas	Unopposed		
Liberal hold		Swing		

=== Pontardawe ===
Pontardawe 1919
Party	Candidate	Votes	%	±%
Labour	David Daniel Davies*	1,008		
Progressive	F.R. Phillips	699		
Independent Labour	David Lewis	375		
Majority		309		
Labour hold		Swing		

=== Port Talbot East ===
Port Talbot East 1919
Party	Candidate	Votes	%	±%
Labour	John Thomas	787		
Labour	William Lewis	446		
Labour win (new seat)				

=== Port Talbot West ===
Port Talbot West 1919
Party	Candidate	Votes	%	±%
Independent	Llewelyn David*	986		
Labour	Thomas Griffiths	446		
Independent win (new seat)				

=== Porthcawl ===
Porthcawl 1919
Party	Candidate	Votes	%	±%
Progressive	Thomas G. Jones	953		
Labour	Jenkin Jones	659		
Conservative	J.I.D. Nicholl	557		
Majority		294		
Progressive gain from Liberal		Swing		

=== Pontlottyn ===
Alderman William Williams withdrew in favour of sitting councillor William Hammond.

Pontlottyn 1919
Party	Candidate	Votes	%	±%
Liberal	William Hammond	Unopposed		
Liberal hold		Swing		

=== Pontypridd ===
Pontypridd 1919
Party	Candidate	Votes	%	±%
Labour	Ben Davies	1,008		
Liberal	Hopkin Morgan*	999		
Majority		9		
Labour gain from Liberal		Swing		

=== Penygraig ===
Penygraig 1919
Party	Candidate	Votes	%	±%
Labour	David Bowen	Unopposed		
Labour hold		Swing		

=== Porth ===
Porth 1919
Party	Candidate	Votes	%	±%
Liberal	William Evans	Unopposed		
Liberal hold		Swing		

=== Swansea Valley ===
Swansea Valley 1919
Party	Candidate	Votes	%	±%
Progressive	Richard Thomas	1,157		
Labour	J.L. Rees	1,074		
Independent	R.A. Jones	269		
Majority				
Progressive hold		Swing		

=== Tonyrefail and Gilfach Goch ===
The Liberal candidate had sought to withdraw before polling day but missed the deadline and his name was therefore included on the ballot.

Tonyrefail and Gilfach Goch 1919
Party	Candidate	Votes	%	±%
Labour	William Arthur Jones	834		
Independent	William Evans	772		
Liberal	David Naunton Morgan	19		
Majority		62		
Labour win (new seat)				

=== Trealaw ===
The sitting member, David Charles Evans, licensed victualler, withdrew, allowing the Labour candidate to be returned unopposed.

Trealaw 1919
Party	Candidate	Votes	%	±%
Labour	Enoch Treharne	Unopposed		
Labour gain from Liberal		Swing		

=== Treforest ===
Treforest 1919
Party	Candidate	Votes	%	±%
Labour	W.H. May	1,194		
Conservative	Dr W. Miles	828		
Majority		366		
Labour gain from Independent		Swing		

=== Treherbert ===
Treherbert 1919
Party	Candidate	Votes	%	±%
Labour	David Edward Williams	Unopposed		
Labour hold		Swing		

=== Treorchy ===
Long-serving councillor, Thomas Jones, was defeated and W.P. Thomas withdrew before the poll.

Treorchy 1919
Party	Candidate	Votes	%	±%
Labour	Rhys Evans	2,309		
Liberal	Thomas Jones*	1,708		
Majority		501		
Labour gain from Liberal		Swing		

=== Tylorstown ===
Tylorstown 1919
Party	Candidate	Votes	%	±%
Labour	David Lewis*	Unopposed		
Labour hold		Swing		

=== Vale of Neath ===
Vale of Neath 1919
Party	Candidate	Votes	%	±%
Liberal	Rev Aneurin Davies	1,768		
Conservative	Col. J. Edwards-Vaughan*	1,267		
Majority				
Liberal gain from Conservative		Swing		

=== Ynyshir ===
Ynyshir 1919
Party	Candidate	Votes	%	±%
Labour	George Dolling	1,501		
Liberal	W.H. Mathias**	1,317		
Majority		184		
Labour gain from Liberal		Swing		

=== Ystalyfera ===
Ystalyfera 1919
Party	Candidate	Votes	%	±%
Labour	Daniel T. Jones	1,112		
Liberal	D.W. Davies*	986		
Majority		126		
Labour gain from Liberal		Swing		

=== Ystrad ===
Ystrad 1919
Party	Candidate	Votes	%	±%
Liberal	Dr W.E. Thomas	Unopposed		
Liberal hold		Swing		

== Election of Aldermen ==
In addition to the elected councillors the County Council consisted of 22 county aldermen. Aldermen were elected by the council, and served a six-year term. Following the 1919 election, there were twelve aldermanic vacancies, following the resignation of Alderman J.E. Evans.

It was initially resolved to re-elect the four retiring aldermen who had been successful at the recent election, namely:

- E.H. Fleming (Lab, Hopkinstown)
- William Jones (Lib, Mountain Ash)
- William Llewellyn (Lib, Ogmore Vale)
- Rev D.H. Williams (Lib, Barry)

In addition, the following eight new aldermen were elected:

- Llewellyn David (Ind, Port Talbot)
- Daniel Daniels (Lib, Dulais Valley)
- W.H. Davies (Lab, Gower)
- Joseph Howells (Lib, Caerphilly)
- Hubert Jenkins (Lab, Cwm Aber) - elected alderman for three years
- William Jenkins (Lab, Glyncorrwg)
- David Lewis (Lab, Tylorstown)
- William Thomas (Lib, Aberdare)

== By-elections ==
Eleven vacancies were caused by the election of aldermen.

=== Aberdare ===
Retired grocer F.W. Mander was returned unopposed following William Thomas's election as alderman.

Aberdare by-election 1919
Party	Candidate	Votes	%	±%
Liberal	Frederick William Mander	Unopposed		
Liberal hold		Swing		

=== Barry by-election ===
The by-election at Barry was caused by the re-election of the Rev, D.H. Williams as alderman. John Lowden, who had held the seat for fifteen years and had stood down in favour of D.H. Williams at the recent election, was defeated by a Labour candidate.

Barry by-election 1919
Party	Candidate	Votes	%	±%
Labour	J.C. Finch	1,174		
Liberal	J. Lowden	1,014		
Majority		170		
Labour gain from Liberal		Swing		

=== Caerphilly by-election ===
A Conservative replaced a Liberal at this by-election.

Caerphilly by-election 1919
Party	Candidate	Votes	%	±%
Conservative	Thomas Edwards	1,525		
Labour	Claude Denscombe	1,134		
Majority		391		
Conservative hold		Swing		

=== Gower by-election ===
Farmer Charles Bevan of Port Eynon held the seat for Labour following W.H. Davies's appointment as alderman.

Gower by-election 1919
Party	Candidate	Votes	%	±%
Labour	Charles Bevan	779		
Liberal	Daniel Williams	702		
Majority		77		
Labour hold		Swing		

=== Hopkinstown by-election ===
The successful candidate, John Tristram, was an engine driver on the Taff Vale Railway and the local secretary of the National Union of Railwaymen.

Hopkinstown by-election 1919
Party	Candidate	Votes	%	±%
Labour	John Tristram	1,555		
Liberal	Hugh Bramwell	1,043		
Majority		512		
Labour hold		Swing		

=== Port Talbot West by-election ===
Edward Lowther, general manager of the Port Talbot Railway and Docks company chosen as joint Conservative and Liberal candidate defeated Thomas Griffiths (Lab).

Port Talbot West by-election 1919
Party	Candidate	Votes	%	±%
Independent	Edward Lowther	1,048		
Labour	Thomas Griffiths	921		
Majority		127		
Independent hold		Swing		

== Bibliography ==
- Williams, Chris (1996). Democratic Rhondda: Politics and society 1885-1951. Cardiff: University of Wales Press.
