= 1934 Glamorgan County Council election =

1934 Welsh local government election

The fifteenth election to Glamorgan County Council, south Wales, took place in March 1934. It was preceded by the 1931 election and followed by the 1937 election.

== Overview of the result ==
By the 1930s, Labour had secured a comfortable majority on the council, and dominated the aldermanic bench. The 1934 election saw little change.

== Boundary changes ==
There were no boundary changes at this election.

== Candidates ==
Many candidates were returned unopposed.

== Contested elections ==
Most of the retiring aldermen were returned. However, two conflicts arose when retiring councillors sought the nomination at the expense of retiring aldermen, at Hopkinstown and Newcastle.

== Outcome ==
Labour retained their majority, losing only one seat, at Pencoed. Their victory in the rural Cowbridge ward reflected their domination of county politics.

== Ward results ==
=== Aberaman ===
Aberaman 1934
Party	Candidate	Votes	%	±%
Labour	Sydney Herbert Stephens*			
Labour hold		Swing		

=== Aberavon ===
Aberavon 1934
Party	Candidate	Votes	%	±%
Labour	Edward Lewis Hare*	Unopposed		
Labour hold		Swing		

=== Abercynon ===
Abercynon 1934
Party	Candidate	Votes	%	±%
Labour	R.A. Thomas*	Unopposed		
Labour hold		Swing		

=== Aberdare Town ===
Aberdare Town 1934
Party	Candidate	Votes	%	±%
Independent	William Thomas*	Unopposed		
Independent hold		Swing		

=== Bargoed ===
Bargoed 1934
Party	Candidate	Votes	%	±%
Labour	William John Kedward*	Unopposed		
Labour hold		Swing		

=== Barry ===
Barry 1934
Party	Candidate	Votes	%	±%
Independent	L.P. Griffiths*	2,158		
Labour	W. East	2,103		
Majority		55		
Independent hold		Swing		

=== Barry Dock ===
Barry Dock 1934
Party	Candidate	Votes	%	±%
Labour	Dorothy Rees	2,194		
Independent	E. Irfon Griffiths*	1,690		
Majority		504		
Labour gain from Independent		Swing		

=== Blaengwawr ===
Blaengwawr 1934
Party	Candidate	Votes	%	±%
Labour	W.J. Edwards*	1,091		
Communist	Trevor Williams	624		
Independent	Henry Vause	358		
Majority		467		
Labour hold		Swing		

=== Bridgend ===
Bridgend 1934
Party	Candidate	Votes	%	±%
Independent	Dapho Llewellyn Powell*	1,988		
Ind. Conservative	R.H. Thomas	1,204		
Majority		784		
Independent hold		Swing		

=== Briton Ferry ===
Briton Ferry 1934
Party	Candidate	Votes	%	±%
Labour	George Gethin*	Unopposed		
Labour hold		Swing		

=== Cadoxton ===
Cadoxton 1934
Party	Candidate	Votes	%	±%
Independent	Dudley Thomas Howe	1,631		
Labour	Frederick Cook	1,160		
Majority		471		
Independent hold		Swing		

=== Caerphilly ===
Caerphilly 1934
Party	Candidate	Votes	%	±%
Labour	Evan Phillips*	2,618		
Independent	Arthur Hopkins	1,445		
Majority		1,173		
Labour hold		Swing		

=== Cilfynydd ===
Cilfynydd 1934
Party	Candidate	Votes	%	±%
Labour	Arthur Pearson*	2,779		
Communist	T.L. Jenkins	504		
Majority		2,275		
Labour hold		Swing		

=== Coedffranc ===
Coedffranc 1934
Party	Candidate	Votes	%	±%
Independent	Ogley L. David*	2,609		
Labour	D.T. Jenkins	2,440		
Majority		169		
Independent hold		Swing		

=== Cowbridge ===
Cowbridge 1934
Party	Candidate	Votes	%	±%
Labour	P.J. Smith	1,847		
Independent	George Lougher*	1,643		
Majority		204		
Labour gain from Independent		Swing		

=== Cwm Aber ===
Cwm Aber 1934
Party	Candidate	Votes	%	±%
Labour	Hubert Jenkins**	Unopposed		
Labour hold		Swing		

=== Cwmavon ===
Cwmavon 1934
Party	Candidate	Votes	%	±%
Labour	John Jones Edwards*	Unopposed		
Labour hold		Swing		

=== Cymmer ===
Cymmer 1934
Party	Candidate	Votes	%	±%
Labour	David Thomas*	1,446		
Independent	Brinley Ithel Rowlands	868		
Majority		578		
Labour hold		Swing		

=== Dinas Powys ===
Dinas Powys 1934
Party	Candidate	Votes	%	±%
Independent	Ivor Broadbent Thomas*	Unopposed		
Independent hold		Swing		

=== Dulais Valley ===
Dulais Valley 1934
Party	Candidate	Votes	%	±%
Labour	Gwilym Davies*	Unopposed		
Labour hold		Swing		

=== Ferndale ===
Ferndale 1934
Party	Candidate	Votes	%	±%
Labour	Jabez Davies**	Unopposed		
Labour gain from Independent		Swing		

=== Gadlys ===
Gadlys 1934
Party	Candidate	Votes	%	±%
Independent	Thomas Phillips	2,068		
Labour	Tom Davies	924		
Majority		1,144		
Independent gain from Labour		Swing		

=== Glyncorrwg ===
Glyncorrwg 1934
Party	Candidate	Votes	%	±%
Labour	Sir William Jenkins**	Unopposed		
Labour hold				

=== Gower ===
Gower 1934
Party	Candidate	Votes	%	±%
Labour	William Henry Davies*	Unopposed		
Labour hold		Swing		

=== Hengoed ===
Hengoed 1934
Party	Candidate	Votes	%	±%
Labour	Thomas Evans*	Unopposed		
Labour hold		Swing		

=== Hopkinstown ===
Hopkinstown 1934
Party	Candidate	Votes	%	±%
Labour	Rhys Thomas Williams	2,203		
Labour	John Tristram**	1,050		
Majority		1,053		
Labour hold		Swing		

=== Kibbor ===
Kibbor 1934
Party	Candidate	Votes	%	±%
Independent	Edgar L. Chappell	1,769		
Independent	John Kane	1,400		
Majority		369		
Independent hold		Swing		

=== Llandaff ===
Llandaff 1934
Party	Candidate	Votes	%	±%
Ind. Conservative	Sir Lewis Lougher*	862		
Independent Liberal	Mary Annie Powell	440		
Majority		422		
Independent hold		Swing		

=== Llandeilo Talybont ===
Llandeilo Talybont 1934
Party	Candidate	Votes	%	±%
Labour	Thomas Jones*	2,405		
Independent	Josiah Jones	1,661		
Majority		744		
Labour hold		Swing		

=== Llanfabon ===
Llanfabon 1934
Party	Candidate	Votes	%	±%
Labour	Charles H. Davies*	1,534		
Independent	William Jones	1,030		
Independent Labour	Charles Fournier	129		
Majority		504		
Labour hold		Swing		

=== Llwydcoed ===
Llwydcoed 1934
Party	Candidate	Votes	%	±%
Independent	Martha Emma Jones*	Unopposed		
Independent hold		Swing		

=== Llwynypia ===
Llwynypia 1934
Party	Candidate	Votes	%	±%
Labour	Philip Haines Rowlands*	2,152		
Communist	John Jones	708		
Majority		1,444		
Labour hold		Swing		

=== Loughor ===
Loughor 1934
Party	Candidate	Votes	%	±%
Labour	David John Davies	2,245		
Independent	Moses Thomas*	1,854		
Majority		1,073		
Labour gain from Independent		Swing		

=== Maesteg, Caerau and Nantyffyllon ===
Maesteg, Caerau and Nantyffyllon 1934
Party	Candidate	Votes	%	±%
Labour	E.D. Evans	1,570		
Communist	Idris Cox	1,348		
Independent	Brinley Richards	1,043		
Majority		232		
Labour hold		Swing		

=== Maesteg, East and West ===
Maesteg East and West 1934
Party	Candidate	Votes	%	±%
Labour	Tom Jenkins	1,930		
Independent	T. Evans	1,716		
Communist	R. Davies	488		
Majority		214		
Labour gain from Independent		Swing		

=== Mountain Ash ===
Mountain Ash 1934
Party	Candidate	Votes	%	±%
Independent	Hon. John H. Bruce*	2,152		
Labour	Miss M. Nicholls	1,757		
Majority		396		
Independent hold		Swing		

=== Neath (North) ===
Neath (North) 1934
Party	Candidate	Votes	%	±%
Independent	David Griffith Davies	1,538		
Labour	Charles P. Huins	1,474		
Majority		64		
Independent hold		Swing		

=== Neath (South) ===
Neath (South) 1934
Party	Candidate	Votes	%	±%
Labour	Rev W. Degwel Thomas*	2,117		
Independent	Mrs M.L. Lloyd	861		
Majority		1,256		
Labour hold		Swing		

=== Newcastle ===
Newcastle 1934
Party	Candidate	Votes	%	±%
Labour	Rev H.R. Protheroe*	2,093		
Independent Labour	Edward Horace Mole**	1,512		
Majority		581		
Labour hold		Swing		

=== Ogmore Valley ===
Ogmore Valley 1934
Party	Candidate	Votes	%	±%
Communist	Frederick Arthur Llewellyn	1,987		
Labour	Rev J.E. Rees	1,118		
Labour	E.L. Howells	1,116		
Independent	S. Moore	440		
Majority		869		
Communist gain from Labour		Swing		

=== Penarth North ===
Penarth North 1934
Party	Candidate	Votes	%	±%
Independent	Frank L. Nicholls	1,215		
Labour	H.J. Cook	819		
Majority		306		
Independent hold		Swing		

=== Penarth South ===
Penarth South 1934
Party	Candidate	Votes	%	±%
Independent	Samuel Thomas*	Unopposed		
Independent hold		Swing		

=== Pencoed ===
Pencoed 1934
Party	Candidate	Votes	%	±%
Independent	Trevor David	1,744		
Labour	Mervyn W. Paine*	1,670		
Majority		74		
Independent gain from Labour		Swing		

=== Penrhiwceiber ===
Penrhiwceiber 1934
Party	Candidate	Votes	%	±%
Labour	John William Bath*	Unopposed		
Labour hold		Swing		

=== Pentre ===
Pentre 1934
Party	Candidate	Votes	%	±%
Labour	James Jenkin Lewis*	2,053		
Independent	Thomas Alfred Thomas	1,482		
Majority		571		
Labour hold		Swing		

=== Pontardawe ===
Pontardawe 1934
Party	Candidate	Votes	%	±%
Labour	Griffith H. Davies	Unopposed		
Labour hold		Swing		

=== Pontyclun ===
Pontyclun 1934
Party	Candidate	Votes	%	±%
Labour	Johnson Miles*	2,574		
Independent	John Williams	1,562		
Majority		1,012		
Labour hold		Swing		

=== Port Talbot East ===
Port Talbot East 1934
Party	Candidate	Votes	%	±%
Labour	Tal Mainwaring*	Unopposed		
Labour hold		Swing		

=== Port Talbot West ===
Port Talbot West 1934
Party	Candidate	Votes	%	±%
Independent	Llewelyn David*	1,584		
Labour	Maurice Leonardo Bonvonni	1,225		
Majority		359		
Independent hold		Swing		

=== Porthcawl ===
Porthcawl 1934
Party	Candidate	Votes	%	±%
Independent	W.A. Howell*	Unopposed		
Independent hold		Swing		

=== Pontlottyn ===
Pontlottyn 1934
Party	Candidate	Votes	%	±%
Labour	William Hammond**	Unopposed		
Labour hold		Swing		

=== Pontycymmer ===
Pontycymmer 1934
Party	Candidate	Votes	%	±%
Labour	Rev William Saunders**	Unopposed		
Labour hold		Swing		

=== Pontypridd Town ===
Pontypridd Town 1934
Party	Candidate	Votes	%	±%
Labour	Myra O'Brien	1,687		
Independent	Gwilym Seaton*	1,243		
Majority		444		
Labour gain from Independent		Swing		

=== Penygraig ===
Penygraig 1934
Party	Candidate	Votes	%	±%
Labour	William Job*	2,312		
Communist	Frederick James Howard	656		
Majority		1,666		
Labour hold		Swing		

=== Porth ===
Porth 1934
Party	Candidate	Votes	%	±%
Independent	William Evans*	1,940		
Communist	Will Paynter	541		
Majority		1,399		
Independent hold		Swing		

=== Swansea Valley ===
Swansea Valley 1934
Party	Candidate	Votes	%	±%
Labour	D.T. Williams**	Unopposed		
Labour hold		Swing		

=== Tonyrefail and Gilfach Goch ===
Tonyrefail and Gilfach Goch 1934
Party	Candidate	Votes	%	±%
Labour	Arthur Jones**	2,515		
Independent	Isaac Christmas Morgan	1,448		
Majority		1,067		
Labour hold		Swing		

=== Trealaw ===
Trealaw 1934
Party	Candidate	Votes	%	±%
Labour	John Atkins*	1,414		
Communist	Lewis Jones	853		
Plaid Cymru	James Kitchener Davies	428		
Majority		561		
Labour hold		Swing		

=== Treforest ===
Treforest 1934
Party	Candidate	Votes	%	±%
Labour	Arthur James Chick*	2,428		
Independent	Zenos Thomas	1,380		
Communist	J.A. Cox	472		
Majority		1,048		
Labour hold		Swing		

=== Treherbert ===
Treherbert 1934
Party	Candidate	Votes	%	±%
Labour	David Edward Williams*	2,856		
Independent	Edwin Jenkins	402		
Majority		2,454		
Labour hold		Swing		

=== Treorchy ===
Treorchy 1934
Party	Candidate	Votes	%	±%
Labour	Rhys Evans**	Unopposed		
Labour hold		Swing		

=== Tylorstown ===
Tylorstown 1934
Party	Candidate	Votes	%	±%
Labour	John Mardy Evans*	Unopposed		
Labour hold		Swing		

=== Vale of Neath ===
Vale of Neath 1934
Party	Candidate	Votes	%	±%
Labour	William A. Betty*	2,871		
Independent	David Arthur	1,824		
Majority		1,047		
Labour hold		Swing		

=== Ynyshir ===
Ynyshir 1934
Party	Candidate	Votes	%	±%
Labour	William Howell	1,852		
Independent	Daniel Jones*	1,595		
Communist	Gwen Ray Evans	334		
Majority		257		
Labour gain from Independent		Swing		

=== Ystalyfera ===
Ystalyfera 1934
Party	Candidate	Votes	%	±%
Labour	John David Brazell**	Unopposed		
Labour hold		Swing		

=== Ystrad ===
Ystrad 1934
Party	Candidate	Votes	%	±%
Labour	Sidney Cadogan*	Unopposed		
Labour hold		Swing		

== Election of Aldermen ==
In addition to the 66 councillors the council consisted of 22 county aldermen. Aldermen were elected by the council, and served a six-year term. Following the 1934 election, there were twelve Aldermanic vacancies (one vacancy due to the recent death of a sitting alderman).

The following retiring aldermen were re-elected:

- William Bowen (Lab, Llanfabon)
- David Daniel Davies (Lab, Pontardawe)
- Rose Davies (Lab, Aberaman)
- John Evans (Lab, Maesteg)
- Johnson Dicks (Lab, Abercynon)
- E.H. Fleming (Lab, Hopkinstown)
- William Jenkins (Lab, Glyncorrwg)
- Caradoc Jones (Lab, Llandeilo Talybont)
- David Lewis (Lab, Tylorstown)
- John Thomas (Lab, Port Talbot)
- Rev D.H. Williams (Ind, Barry)

== By-elections ==
Eleven vacancies were caused by the election of aldermen.

=== Aberaman by-election ===
Aberaman by-election 1934
Party	Candidate	Votes	%	±%
Labour	Sydney Herbert Stephens*			
Labour hold		Swing		

=== Abercynon by-election ===
Party	Candidate	Votes	%	±%
Labour				
Independent				
Majority				
Labour gain from Independent		Swing		

=== Barry by-election ===
Barry by-election 1934
Party	Candidate	Votes	%	±%
Independent	L.P. Griffiths	2,032		
Labour	Rev R.H. Lomas	1,624		
Majority		408		
Independent gain from Labour		Swing		

=== Glyncorrwg by-election ===
Party	Candidate	Votes	%	±%
Labour				
Independent				
Majority				
Labour gain from Independent		Swing		

=== Hopkinstown by-election ===
Party	Candidate	Votes	%	±%
Labour				
Independent				
Majority				
Labour gain from Independent		Swing		

=== Llandeilo Talybont by-election ===
Llandeilo Talybont
Party	Candidate	Votes	%	±%
Independent	Llewellyn Davies	1,501		
Labour	J. Powell	1,378		
Majority				
Independent gain from Labour		Swing		

=== Llanfabon by-election ===
Llanfabon by-election 1934
Party	Candidate	Votes	%	±%
Labour	Charles H. Davies	1,212		
Independent	William Jones	1,169		
Majority		43		
Labour hold		Swing		

=== Maesteg by-election ===
Party	Candidate	Votes	%	±%
Labour				
Independent				
Majority				
Labour gain from Independent		Swing		

=== Pontardawe by-election ===
Pontardawe by-election 1934
Party	Candidate	Votes	%	±%
Labour	Charles Williams	Unopposed		
Labour hold		Swing		

=== Port Talbot by-election ===
Party	Candidate	Votes	%	±%
Labour				
Independent				
Majority				
Labour gain from Independent		Swing		

=== Tylorstown by-election ===
Tylorstown by-election 1934
Party	Candidate	Votes	%	±%
Labour	John Mardy Evans*	1,977		
Communist	George Edward Maslin	584		
Independent	David John	284		
Majority		1,393		
Labour hold		Swing		

== Neath South by-election 1935 ==
A by-election was held following the elevation of the Rev. Degwel Thomas to fill a vacancy on the aldermanic bench. Charles Percival Huins, a pioneer of the Labour movement in the Neath area and a former national president of the Shop Assistants Union comfortably held the seat by an unexpectedly large majority.

Neath South by-election 1935
Party	Candidate	Votes	%	±%
Labour	Charles P. Huins	2.024		
Independent	Thomas Cole	975		
Majority		1,049		
Labour hold		Swing		

== Bibliography ==
- Williams, Chris (1996). Democratic Rhondda: Politics and society 1885-1951. Cardiff: University of Wales Press.
