= 1925 Glamorgan County Council election =

1925 Welsh local government election

The twelfth election to Glamorgan County Council, south Wales, took place in March 1925. It was preceded by the 1922 election and followed by the 1928 election.

== Overview of the result ==
Having lost its majority at the 1922 elections, Labour regained control of the County Council by winning seven seats.

== Boundary Changes ==
There were no boundary changes at this election.

== Candidates ==
16 councillors were returned unopposed.

Of the eleven retiring aldermen, nine sought re-election. Seven of their number were returned unopposed; these included the chairman of the County Council, Daniel Daniels (Lib, Dulais Valley) after the sitting Labour councillor stood down in his favour.

== Contested Elections ==
The pattern of contests was similar to 1922, although Labour contested some seats that it had not previously stood.

Three retiring aldermen faced opposition. Rev D.H. Williams (Lib, Barry) faced a Labour opponent and the seat had been held by Labour since a 1919 by-election. W.H. Davies (Lab, Gower) faced an Independent opponent and in Caerphilly the sitting Independent stood down in favour of Joseph Howells though he faced a Labour challenge.

== Outcome ==
Labour gained seven seats and lost only one, establishing a firm majority on the County Council.

== Ward results ==
=== Aberaman ===
Rose Davies captured a seat previously held by a Liberal and became the first woman elected to the County Council.

Aberaman 1925
Party	Candidate	Votes	%	±%
Labour	Florence Rose Davies	1,989		
Independent	Joseph Martin	1,786		
Majority		203		
Labour gain from Liberal		Swing		

=== Aberavon ===
Aberavon 1925
Party	Candidate	Votes	%	±%
Labour	Edward Lewis Hare*	Unopposed		
Labour hold		Swing		

=== Abercynon ===
Abercynon 1925
Party	Candidate	Votes	%	±%
Labour	Johnson Dicks	2,158		
Liberal	Dr J. Llewelyn Morris*	1,975		
Majority		183		
Labour gain from Liberal		Swing		

=== Aberdare Town ===
Aberdare Town 1925
Party	Candidate	Votes	%	±%
Liberal	William Thomas**	Unopposed		
Liberal hold		Swing		

=== Bargoed ===
Bargoed 1925
Party	Candidate	Votes	%	±%
Labour	W.H. Hopkins	1,284		
Independent	Dr B.H.E. McCrae*	1,136		
Majority		148		
Labour gain from Independent		Swing		

=== Barry ===
Alderman D.H. Williams, chair of the Central Welsh Board of Education, comfortably won the seat but this was technically a Liberal gain from Labour who had held the seat since a by-election after Williams was re-elected as alderman in 1919.

Barry 1925
Party	Candidate	Votes	%	±%
Liberal	Rev D.H. Williams**	2,216		
Labour	B.B. Bembridge	734		
Majority		1,482		
Liberal gain from Labour		Swing		

=== Barry Dock ===
Barry Dock 1925
Party	Candidate	Votes	%	±%
Liberal	W.M. Davies*	Unopposed		
Majority				
Liberal hold		Swing		

=== Blaengwawr ===
Blaengwawr 1925
Party	Candidate	Votes	%	±%
Labour	William J. Edwards	1,189		
Independent	H. Cohen	787		
Majority		402		
Labour gain from Liberal		Swing		

=== Bridgend ===
Bridgend 1925
Party	Candidate	Votes	%	±%
Independent	Dapho Llewellyn Powell**	Unopposed		
Independent hold		Swing		

=== Briton Ferry ===
Briton Ferry 1925
Party	Candidate	Votes	%	±%
Labour	G. Gethin	1,800		
Conservative	M.G. Roberts*	1,562		
Majority		243		
Labour gain from Conservative		Swing		

=== Cadoxton ===
Cadoxton 1925
Party	Candidate	Votes	%	±%
Conservative	J.R. Llewellyn*	Unopposed		
Majority				
Conservative hold		Swing		

=== Caerphilly ===
Alderman Joseph Howells won the seat after the sitting Independent councillor withdrew in his favour.

Caerphilly 1925
Party	Candidate	Votes	%	±%
Liberal	Joseph Howells**	2,067		
Labour	Evan Phillips	1,477		
Majority		610		
Liberal gain from Independent		Swing		

=== Cilfynydd ===
Cilfynydd 1925
Party	Candidate	Votes	%	±%
Labour	Dan Rees*	Unopposed		
Labour hold		Swing		

=== Coedffranc ===
W.T. Jenkins had previously stood as an Independent but now declared himself a Labour supporter.

Coedffranc 1925
Party	Candidate	Votes	%	±%
Labour	W. Phillip Jenkins	2,007		
Independent	Ogley L. David	1,893		
Majority		114		
Labour gain from Conservative		Swing		

=== Cowbridge ===
Cowbridge 1925
Party	Candidate	Votes	%	±%
Conservative	Colonel H.R. Homfray*	2,139		
Labour	Johnson Miles	639		
Majority		1,500		
Conservative hold		Swing		

=== Cwm Aber ===
Cwm Aber 1922
Party	Candidate	Votes	%	±%
Labour	Hubert Jenkins*	Unopposed		
Majority				
Labour hold		Swing		

=== Cwmavon ===
Cwmavon 1925
Party	Candidate	Votes	%	±%
Labour	John Jones Edwards*	Unopposed		
Majority				
Labour hold		Swing		

=== Cymmer ===
Cymmer 1925
Party	Candidate	Votes	%	±%
Labour	David Watts-Morgan*	Unopposed		
Labour hold				

=== Dinas Powys ===
Dinas Powys 1925
Party	Candidate	Votes	%	±%
Conservative	Claude D. Thompson*	Unopposed		
Conservative hold		Swing		

=== Dulais Valley ===
Alderman Daniel Daniels of Crynant, chairman of the County Council, was returned unopposed after the sitting Labour councillor did not contest the seat. This was technically a Liberal gain.

Dulais Valley 1925
Party	Candidate	Votes	%	±%
Liberal	Daniel Daniels**	Unopposed		
Liberal gain from Labour		Swing		

=== Ferndale ===
Ferndale 1922
Party	Candidate	Votes	%	±%
Labour	Jabez Davies*	Unopposed		
Majority				
Labour hold		Swing		

=== Gadlys ===
Gadlys 1925
Party	Candidate	Votes	%	±%
Liberal	T. Marchant Harries*	Unopposed		
Liberal hold		Swing		

=== Glyncorrwg ===
Glyncorrwg 1925
Party	Candidate	Votes	%	±%
Labour	William Jenkins**	Unopposed		
Labour hold				

=== Gower ===
Gower 1925
Party	Candidate	Votes	%	±%
Independent	Frederick W. Davies*	1,634		
Labour	William Henry Davies**	1,441		
Majority		193		
Independent hold		Swing		

=== Hengoed ===
Hengoed 1925
Party	Candidate	Votes	%	±%
Liberal	Edward Richards*	1,216		
Labour	E. Jenkins	995		
Majority		221		
Liberal hold		Swing		

=== Hopkinstown ===
Hopkinstown 1925
Party	Candidate	Votes	%	±%
Labour	E.H. Fleming**	Unopposed		
Labour hold		Swing		

=== Kibbor ===
Henry Lewis again returned after many years.

Kibbor 1925
Party	Candidate	Votes	%	±%
Conservative	Henry Lewis*	1,035		
Liberal	D. Morgan Rees	379		
Majority		656		
Conservative hold		Swing		

=== Llandaff ===
Llandaff 1925
Party	Candidate	Votes	%	±%
Conservative	Lewis Lougher*	Unopposed		
Conservative hold				

=== Llandeilo Talybont ===
Llandeilo Talybont 1925
Party	Candidate	Votes	%	±%
Labour	Caradog Jones	1,190		
Independent	Llewellyn Davies	957		
Majority		233		
Labour hold		Swing		

=== Llanfabon ===
Llanfabon 1925
Party	Candidate	Votes	%	±%
Labour	John Phillips*	1,360		
Liberal	Arthur Hopkins	1,175		
Majority		185		
Labour hold		Swing		

=== Llwydcoed ===
Llwydcoed 1925
Party	Candidate	Votes	%	±%
Liberal	William Morgan Llewellyn*	Unopposed		
Liberal hold		Swing		

=== Llwynypia and Clydach ===
James Evans, grocer, elected following Richard Lewis's election as alderman in 1901, was returned unopposed.

Llwynypia and Clydach 1904
Party	Candidate	Votes	%	±%
Liberal	James Evans*	unopposed		

=== Loughor ===
The sitting member had been elected as a Liberal in 1922.

Loughor 1925
Party	Candidate	Votes	%	±%
Independent	Thomas J. Thomas*	1,582		
Labour	William Evans	1,534		
Majority		48		
Independent hold		Swing		

=== Maesteg, Caerau and Nantyffyllon ===
Maesteg, Caerau and Nantyffyllon 1922
Party	Candidate	Votes	%	±%
Labour	John Evans*	Unopposed		
Labour hold		Swing		

=== Maesteg, East and West ===
Maesteg East and West 1925
Party	Candidate	Votes	%	±%
Independent	Thomas E. Hopkins*	1,881		
Labour	E. Barnett	1,026		
Majority		855		
Independent hold		Swing		

=== Mountain Ash ===
Mountain Ash 1925
Party	Candidate	Votes	%	±%
Liberal	Lord Aberdare*	Unopposed		
Liberal hold		Swing		

=== Neath (North) ===
Neath (North) 1925
Party	Candidate	Votes	%	±%
Liberal	David Griffith Davies*	Unopposed		
Liberal hold		Swing		

=== Neath (South) ===
Neath (South) 1925
Party	Candidate	Votes	%	±%
Liberal	Frederick William Gibbins*	Unopposed		
Liberal hold				

=== Newcastle ===
Newcastle 1925
Party	Candidate	Votes	%	±%
Labour	E.H. Mole*	Unopposed		
Labour hold		Swing		

=== Ogmore Valley ===
Ogmore Valley 1925
Party	Candidate	Votes	%	±%
Labour	David J. Thomas*	Unopposed		
Labour hold		Swing		

=== Penarth North ===
Penarth North 1925
Party	Candidate	Votes	%	±%
Conservative	Walter Hallett	655		
Labour	Peter Freeman	646		
Majority		9		
Conservative hold		Swing		

=== Penarth South ===
Penarth South 1925
Party	Candidate	Votes	%	±%
Conservative	Samuel Thomas*	Unopposed		
Conservative hold		Swing		

=== Pencoed ===
Pencoed 1925
Party	Candidate	Votes	%	±%
Independent	W.A. Howell**	Unopposed		
Independent hold		Swing		

=== Penrhiwceiber ===
Penrhiwceiber 1925
Party	Candidate	Votes	%	±%
Labour	E.O. James	2,740		
Liberal	Dr. Ben Phillips-Jones*	2,289		
Majority		451		
Labour gain from Liberal		Swing		

=== Pentre ===
Pentre 1925
Party	Candidate	Votes	%	±%
Liberal	Thomas Alfred Thomas*	1,542		
Labour	T.T. Andrews	1,076		
Majority		486		
Liberal hold		Swing		

=== Pontardawe ===
Pontardawe 1925
Party	Candidate	Votes	%	±%
Labour	David Daniel Davies*	Unopposed		
Labour hold		Swing		

=== Pontyclun ===
Pontyclun 1922
Party	Candidate	Votes	%	±%
Conservative	Thomas Jenkins*	1,718		
Labour	D. Harris	623		
Majority		1,095		
Conservative hold		Swing		

=== Port Talbot East ===
Port Talbot East 1925
Party	Candidate	Votes	%	±%
Labour	John Thomas*	Unopposed		
Labour hold		Swing		

=== Port Talbot West ===
Port Talbot West 1925
Party	Candidate	Votes	%	±%
Independent	Llewelyn David**			
Independent hold		Swing		

=== Porthcawl ===
Porthcawl 1925
Party	Candidate	Votes	%	±%
Independent	Sir Thomas Jones*	1,644		
Labour	Thomas Woods	1,340		
Majority		255		
Independent hold		Swing		

=== Pontlottyn ===
Pontlottyn 1925
Party	Candidate	Votes	%	±%
Liberal	William Hammond*	Unopposed		
Majority				
Liberal hold		Swing		

=== Pontycymmer ===
Pontycymmer 1925
Party	Candidate	Votes	%	±%
Independent	Jonathan Maddocks	1,654		
Labour	J. Jones	1,610		
Majority		44		
Independent gain from Labour		Swing		

=== Pontypridd ===
Pontypridd 1904
Party	Candidate	Votes	%	±%
Labour	Fleming	602		
Liberal	James Roberts*	398		
Conservative	H.M. Gregory	383		
Majority		204		
Labour gain from Liberal		Swing		

=== Penygraig ===
Penygraig 1922
Party	Candidate	Votes	%	±%
Labour	Nefydd Thomas	Unopposed		
Labour hold		Swing		

=== Porth ===
Porth 1925
Party	Candidate	Votes	%	±%
Liberal	William Evans*	Unopposed		
Majority				
Liberal hold		Swing		

=== Swansea Valley ===
Swansea Valley 1925
Party	Candidate	Votes	%	±%
Independent	Richard Thomas*	2,300		
Labour	J.L. Rees	1,622		
Majority		678		
Independent hold		Swing		

=== Tonyrefail and Gilfach Goch ===
Tonyrefail and Gilfach Goch 1925
Party	Candidate	Votes	%	±%
Labour	William Arthur Jones*	1,496		
Independent	Morgan Lloyd Griffiths	882		
Independent	Levi Morgan	191		
Majority		614		
Labour hold		Swing		

=== Treforest ===
Trealaw 1925
Party	Candidate	Votes	%	±%
Labour	Enoch Treharne	Unopposed		
Majority				
Labour gain from Liberal		Swing		

=== Treforest ===
The sitting member had been elected as a Liberal in 1922.

Treforest 1925
Party	Candidate	Votes	%	±%
Labour	Arthur James Chick	1,488		
Independent	John Thomas Rees*	1,164		
Majority		324		
Labour gain from Independent		Swing		

=== Treherbert ===
Enoch Davies, returned in 1901 following William Morgan's re-election as alderman, was elected unopposed.

Treherbert 1925
Party	Candidate	Votes	%	±%
Liberal	Enoch Davies*	unopposed		
Liberal hold		Swing		

=== Treorchy ===
Thomas Jones, Co-operative stores manager, was returned unopposed.

Treorchy 1925
Party	Candidate	Votes	%	±%
Liberal	Thomas Jones*	unopposed		
Liberal hold		Swing		

=== Tylorstown ===
Tylorstown 1925
Party	Candidate	Votes	%	±%
Liberal	Dr T.H. Morris*	Unopposed		
Liberal hold		Swing		

=== Vale of Neath ===
Vale of Neath 1925
Party	Candidate	Votes	%	±%
Independent	D.H. Jones*	Unopposed		
Independent hold		Swing		

=== Ynyshir ===
Ynyshir 1925
Party	Candidate	Votes	%	±%
Labour	George Dalling*	996		
Independent Labour	William Thomas	985		
Liberal	D. Lewis Daniel	715		
Majority		11		
Liberal hold		Swing		

=== Ystalyfera ===
D.W. Davies regained the seat he lost three years previously.

Ystalyfera 1925
Party	Candidate	Votes	%	±%
Independent	D.W. Davies	1,527		
Labour	Daniel T. Jones*	1,153		
Majority		374		
Independent gain from Labour		Swing		

=== Ystrad ===
Ystrad 1925
Party	Candidate	Votes	%	±%
Liberal	Dr W.E. Thomas*	1,818		
Labour	J. Davies	1,183		
Majority		635		
Liberal hold		Swing		

== Election of Aldermen ==
In addition to the 66 councillors the council consisted of 22 county aldermen. Aldermen were elected by the council, and served a six-year term. Following the 1925 election, there were eleven Aldermanic vacancies, all of which were filled by Labour nominees (including one long-serving Liberal). These included the first woman elected to the Council, Rose Davies (Aberaman).

The following retiring aldermen were re-elected:

- E.H. Fleming (Lab, Hopkinstown)
- William Jenkins (Lab, Glyncorrwg)
- David Lewis (Lab, Tylorstown)
- Rev D.H. Williams (Lib, Barry)

In addition, the following seven new aldermen were elected:

- David Daniel Davies (Lab, Pontardawe)
- Rose Davies (Lab, Aberaman)
- John Evans (Lan, Maesteg)
- Johnson Dicks (Lab, Abercynon)
- Caradoc Jones (Lab, Llandeilo Talybont)
- John Phillips (Lab, Llanfabon)
- John Thomas (Lab, Port Talbot)

The following retiring aldermen were re-elected as members of the Council but were not re-elected as aldermen:

- Llewellyn David (Ind, Port Talbot)
- Daniel Daniels (Lib, Dulais Valley)
- Joseph Howells (Lib, Caerphilly)
- William Thomas (Lib, Aberdare)

== By-elections ==
Eleven vacancies were caused by the election of aldermen. At Abercynon, Joseph Martin (Ind) who had been narrowly defeated by Rose Davies a few weeks earlier, again lost by a small margin. Labour also won a narrow victory at Abercynon where the newly elected councillor had, like Rose Davies, been immediately elected an alderman.

=== Aberaman by-election ===
Aberaman
Party	Candidate	Votes	%	±%
Labour	William Rees	2,400		
Independent	Joseph Martin	2,315		
Majority		95		
Labour gain from Independent		Swing		

=== Abercynon by-election ===
Abercynon
Party	Candidate	Votes	%	±%
Labour	R.A. Thomas	2,082		
Independent	William Williams	1,802		
Majority		280		
Labour gain from Independent		Swing		

=== Barry by-election ===
Party	Candidate	Votes	%	±%
Labour				
Independent				
Majority				
Labour gain from Independent		Swing		

=== Glyncorrwg by-election ===
Party	Candidate	Votes	%	±%
Labour				
Independent				
Majority				
Labour gain from Independent		Swing		

=== Hopkinstown by-election ===
Party	Candidate	Votes	%	±%
Labour				
Independent				
Majority				
Labour gain from Independent		Swing		

=== Llandeilo Talybont by-election ===
Llandeilo Talybont
Party	Candidate	Votes	%	±%
Independent	Llewellyn Davies	1,501		
Labour	J. Powell	1,378		
Majority				
Independent gain from Labour		Swing		

=== Llanfabon by-election ===
Llanfabon
Party	Candidate	Votes	%	±%
Labour	William Bowen	1,338		
Independent	William Hopkins	1,189		
Majority		149		
Labour hold		Swing		

=== Maesteg by-election ===
Party	Candidate	Votes	%	±%
Labour				
Independent				
Majority				
Labour gain from Independent		Swing		

=== Pontardawe by-election ===
Pontardawe by-election 1925
Party	Candidate	Votes	%	±%
Labour	Charles Williams	Unopposed		
Labour hold		Swing		

=== Port Talbot by-election ===
Party	Candidate	Votes	%	±%
Labour				
Independent				
Majority				
Labour gain from Independent		Swing		

=== Tylorstown by-election ===
Party	Candidate	Votes	%	±%
Labour				
Independent				
Majority				
Labour gain from Independent		Swing		

== Bibliography ==
- Williams, Chris (1996). Democratic Rhondda: Politics and society 1885-1951. Cardiff: University of Wales Press.
