= General Young =

General Young may refer to:

- David Young (British Army officer) (1926–2000), British Army lieutenant general
- David G. Young III (fl. 1960s–2000s), U.S. Air Force brigadier general
- Frederick Young (East India Company officer) (1786–1874), British East India Company Army generals
- James Young (British Army officer) (1858–1926), British Army major general
- Peter Young (British Army officer, born 1912) (1912–1976), British Army major general
- Pierce M. B. Young (1836–1896), Confederate States Army major general
- Richard W. Young (1858–1919), U.S. Army brigadier general
- Robert Young (soldier) (1877–1953), New Zealand Military Forces major general
- Robert Nicholas Young (1900–1964), U.S. Army lieutenant general
- Samuel Baldwin Marks Young (1840–1924), U.S. Army lieutenant general
- Thomas L. Young (1832–1888), Union Army post-war brevetted brigadier general
- William Hugh Young (1838–1901), Confederate States Army brigadier general

== See also ==
- Attorney General Young (disambiguation)
