= Rose Davies =

Rose Davies may refer to:

- Rose Davies (activist) (1882–1958), Welsh activist
- Rose Davies (athlete) (born 1999), Australian runner
