= Attorney General Young =

Attorney General Young may refer to:

- Alfred Karney Young (1864–1942), Attorney General of British East Africa and Attorney-General of Fiji
- Charles Young (governor) (1812–after 1875), Attorney General of the Colony of Prince Edward Island
- David Young (Ontario politician) (born 1957), Attorney General of Ontario
- Edward T. Young (1858–1940), Attorney General of Minnesota

== See also ==
- General Young (disambiguation)
