= David Young (cleric) =

David Young (1844 - 1913) was a Wesleyan minister and historian.

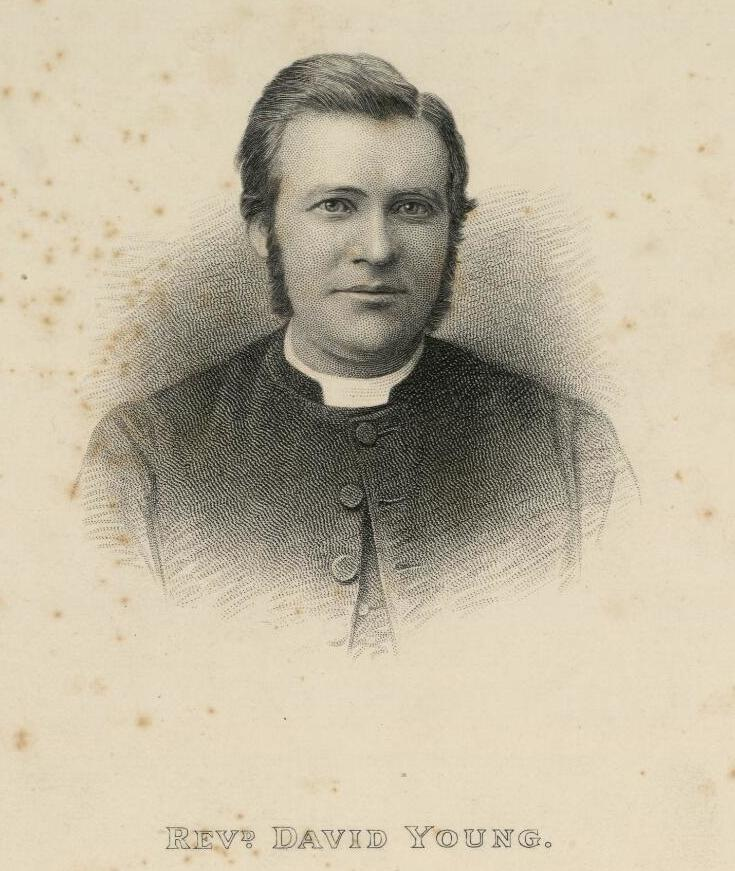
Portrait of Revd. David Young

Young was born on 3 November 1844, near Haverfordwest, later moving with his family to Pontlottyn. In 1893 Young published The Origin and History of Methodism in Wales, a history of Wesleyanism in the country. David Young died on 4 August 1913, at Margate.
