= David Allan Young =

American entomologist (1915–1991)

David Allan Young Jr. (May 26, 1915, in Wilkinsburg, Pennsylvania – June 8, 1991, in Louisville, Kentucky) was an American entomologist who specialized in the taxonomy of the Cicadellidae and authored a comprehensive treatment of the family with numerous genera and species described and named by him. This work in three parts, Taxonomic Study of the Cicadellinae (Homoptera: Cicadellidae), covered 292 genera.

== Life and work ==
David Young's father was a traveling salesman and he attended school in western Pennsylvania and high school in Louisville. He studied at the University of Louisville and graduated with a Bachelor of Arts in 1939. He then taught science at the Louisville Public School System and later studied entomology at the Cornell University and obtained a Master of Science in 1942. During the second world war, he joined the US Army as a private and was honorably discharged as a first lieutenant in 1945. He then became an instructor in the Biology department at the University of Louisville. He worked under Dr R. H. Beamer and obtained a doctorate in entomology in 1950. He then worked as a taxonomist in the United States National Museum, Washington, D.C. working on the identification of insects in the quarantine procedures of the United States Department of Agriculture.

He took up a position of an associate professor at the North Carolina State University in 1957 and continued his systematic work on leafhoppers. His work on the world fauna of leafhoppers included descriptions of 807 new species, 207 new genera and a new tribe. His Taxonomic study of the Cicadellinae (Homoptera:Cicadellidae) with 2061 pages covered 292 genera around the world and was published in three parts between 1968 and 1986. J.P. Kramer (1978, Proceedings of the Entomological Society of Washington 80:456) declared Part 2 of it as "the most outstanding and most comprehensive single volume ever produced on a large segment of the Cicadellidae."

His work was honored by the North Carolina Entomological Society with an award for Outstanding Contribution to Entomology in 1976. He was a fellow of the Washington Academy of Science.

He died of an aneurysm on 8 June 1991 while his wife Irene Rouhier died four days later of cancer. The D.A. Young Memorial Symposium Characters for the Higher Classification of Cicadellidae was held in his honor at the 8th International Auchenorrhyncha Congress in Delphi, Greece, August 1993.

The froghopper species Tiodus youngi from Peru was named after him.

== Selected publications ==
- Young, D. A. (1957). "The leafhopper tribe Alebrini (Homoptera: Cicadellidae)". Proceedings of the United States National Museum. 107: 127–277. doi:10.5479/si.00963801.107-3386.127.
- Young, David A. (1968). "Taxonomic study of the Cicadellinae (Homoptera: Cicadellidae). Part 1. Proconiini". Bulletin of the United States National Museum. 261: 1–287.
- Young, David A. (1977). "Taxonomic study of the Cicadellinae (Homoptera, Cicadellidae). Part 2. New World Cicadellini and the genus Cicadella". North Carolina Agricultural Experiment Station Technical Bulletin. 239: 1–1135.
- Young, David A. (1986). "Taxonomic study of the Cicadellinae (Homoptera, Cicadellidae). Part 3. Old World Cicadellini". North Carolina Agricultural Experiment Station Technical Bulletin. 281: 1–639.
