= David Young (judge) =

American judge

David Young is an American judge, who starred on Judge David Young, a daytime nationally syndicated court show. He is the first openly gay TV judge. He also hosts the Justice with a Snap! radio show on the OutQ channel on Sirius Satellite Radio and XM Satellite Radio, both owned by Sirius XM Radio, Inc.

== Personal life ==
After serving as president of the student body government as an undergraduate at Tulane University, Young attended the University of Miami School of Law. He subsequently became an elected judge in the Miami-Dade County judicial system, until his resignation from the bench in 2007 to star in his own daily television court show.

Scott Bernstein and David Young got married on December 21, 2014. Scott Bernstein is also an elected judge in the Miami-Dade County judicial system.

In 2002, Young completed Harvard Kennedy School's program for Senior Executives in State and Local Government as a David Bohnett LGBTQ Victory Institute Leadership Fellow.

== Career ==
Young was an assistant state attorney under Janet Reno when she was Florida State Attorney. In 2000, he was elected Circuit Court judge in Miami-Dade County. The local Republican Party tried to recruit him as a Congressional candidate in 2004 but the party's negative stance toward gay politics convinced him to join the Democratic Party. His last day as a circuit judge was declared "Judge David Young Day". He is also a member of the board of the Humane Society.

Young presided over the America West Flight 556 case, in which two America West Airlines pilots were convicted of trying to fly a plane while drunk.

After his two year television career, Young was once again elected to the Circuit Court of Miami-Dade County, Florida, without opposition in 2016, and again in 2022.

He would gain notoriety after returning to the Circuit Court for being the judge in the Joe Jonas and Sophie Turner divorce case.

== Television show ==
Young became the first openly gay TV judge as the star of a daytime syndicated court show, Judge David Young.

== Satellite radio show ==
Sirius XM Radio, Inc. announced on May 4, 2009 the launch of Justice with a Snap!, a new radio show hosted by Young. It airs on Saturdays on both Sirius Satellite Radio and XM Satellite Radio on the OutQ channel.

== See also ==
- List of LGBT jurists in the United States
