= Dave Young (footballer) =

English footballer

Personal information
- Full name: David Young
- Date of birth: 27 April 1962 (age 64)
- Place of birth: Birkenhead, England
- Position: Midfielder

Youth career
- Wrexham
- Tranmere Rovers

Senior career*
Years	Team	Apps	(Gls)
1982	Mossley	4	(0)
1983	Wigan Athletic	3	(0)
- Oswestry Town
- Northwich Victoria
- * Club domestic league appearances and goals

David Young (born 27 April 1962) is an English former professional football midfielder. He played in the English Football League for Wigan Athletic.

Young was a junior with both Wrexham and Tranmere Rovers before attending and playing for the University of Manchester. He played four times for Mossley in the 1982–83 season, before joining Wigan Athletic. He played three times that season before leaving to join Oswestry Town.

He later played for Northwich Victoria.
