= Judge David Young =

American reality court show (2007–2009)

- Genre: Arbitration-based reality court show
- Starring: Judge David Young; Bailiff Tawya Young
- Country of origin: United States

Production
- Running time: 30 minutes approx. (including commercials)
- Production company: Sony Pictures Television

Original release
- Network: Syndication
- Release: September 10, 2007 – September 4, 2009

Judge David Young is an American arbitration-based reality court show presided over by former Miami-Dade County Circuit Court Judge David Young. The series aired in first-run syndication. It premiered on television stations across the United States and Canada on September 10, 2007, and ran for 2 seasons until September 4, 2009.

Young is the first openly gay TV judge. In the program, he presided over small claims court cases. The series was produced and distributed by Sony Pictures Television. The series was filmed at the Chelsea Studios in New York City.

== Format and case handling approach ==
Much of Young's behavior was comically campy. In fact, the tagline of his court show parodied Judge Judy's "Justice with an Attitude" tagline, using "Justice with a Snap" instead. Young frequently finger-snapped the litigants upon sassy remarks and randomly burst into show tunes. He made a point of warning his litigants that there is only "one queen" allowed in the courtroom and that's him. Young said he wanted to be a role model for LGBT youth. In every episode, Young explained his position after his ruling to the studio audience. He often firmly silenced litigants if they were interrupting or becoming a problem. One of his trademarks was his humorous interactions with his bailiff, Tawya Young. Although David and Tawya share the same last name, they have no relation to each other.

On January 10, 2009 it was announced that his contract would not be renewed for a third season.

== Cancellation ==
Judge David Young ran for two seasons, from September 10, 2007, to September 4, 2009. SPT subsequently did not renew Judge David Young due to a change in Sony's daytime television administration. They did not renew any of their original daytime television syndicated series.
