= David Young (saxophonist) =

American jazz musician

David A. "Dave" Young (January 14, 1912 – December 25, 1992) was an American jazz tenor saxophonist.

Young was born in Nashville but raised in Chicago, where he joined a band made up of newsboys from the Chicago Defender. In the 1930s he worked in the bands of Frankie Half Pint Jaxon, Fletcher Henderson, Carroll Dickerson, and Roy Eldridge. He was with Horace Henderson in 1939-1940, and during World War II worked with Walter Fuller, Lucky Millinder, and Sammy Price. He was drafted into the U.S. Navy in 1944 and played in a military band until the end of the war, at which time he returned to Chicago and played with Dinah Washington.

In the 1950s Young left his career in music and returned to working for the Chicago Defender, this time as an advertising executive.
