= David Young (footballer, born 1965) =

English footballer

Personal information
- Full name: David Alan Young
- Date of birth: 31 January 1965
- Place of birth: Trimdon, County Durham, England
- Position: Left back

Youth career
- Darlington

Senior career*
Years	Team	Apps	(Gls)
1982–1984	Darlington	18	(0)
- Spennymoor United
- * Club domestic league appearances and goals

David Alan Young (born 31 January 1965) is an English former footballer who played as a left back in the Football League for Darlington in the 1980s. He also played non-league football for Spennymoor United.

In 2026 he was convicted of animal cruelty after a neighbour recorded video footage of him kicking his elderly dog.
