= Rose Davies (activist) =

Welsh political activist (1882–1958)

Rose Davies CBE (16 September 1882 – 13 December 1958) was a Welsh teacher, feminist, and labour activist, and an elected local official associated with the Independent Labour Party.

== Early life and education ==
Florence Rose Rees was born in 1882, at Aberdare, one of the seven children of William Henry Rees and Fanny (Berry) Rees. Her father was a tinworker. Miss Rees became a teacher in local schools as a teenager, with only on-the-job training as an assistant and monitor.

== Career ==
As a teacher she became active with the Independent Labour Party and with the Women's Co-operative Guild. After marrying in 1908, she left the classroom and worked more intensely for political causes. In 1915 she became the first woman to chair the education committee of Aberdare. She helped to write education policy for Keir Hardie's campaign, with whom she had a close friendship.

During World War I she represented Glamorgan in the Women's Land Army. In 1919 she ran for the Aberdare council, and in 1920 she won a seat. She worked especially for women's health issues, including a birth control clinic and an infant/maternal welfare clinic. She was the first woman elected to the Glamorgan County Council, in 1925. She became an alderman, and in 1949 she became the first woman to chair the county council, after having "chaired every single committee... at various times."

The Davieses hosted peace movement meetings in their home, including a 1923 appearance by George Maitland Lloyd Davies. In 1930 she was nominated to attend the Geneva meeting of the League of Nations. Among her many other activities, she was a governor of the University College of Wales, Aberystwyth, and also of the University College of South Wales and Monmouthshire. Mrs. Davies received the MBE in 1934, and was made Commander of the Order of the British Empire in 1952.

== Personal life ==
Rose Rees married fellow teacher and labour activist Edward Davies in 1908. They had five children together. She was widowed in 1951 and died in late 1958, age 76.

A collection of her papers is archived at Glamorgan Record Office.

== Legacy ==
In 2023 a Purple Plaque was installed at the Cynon Valley Museum in Aberdare to commemorate her work.
