= David G. Young III =

American physician

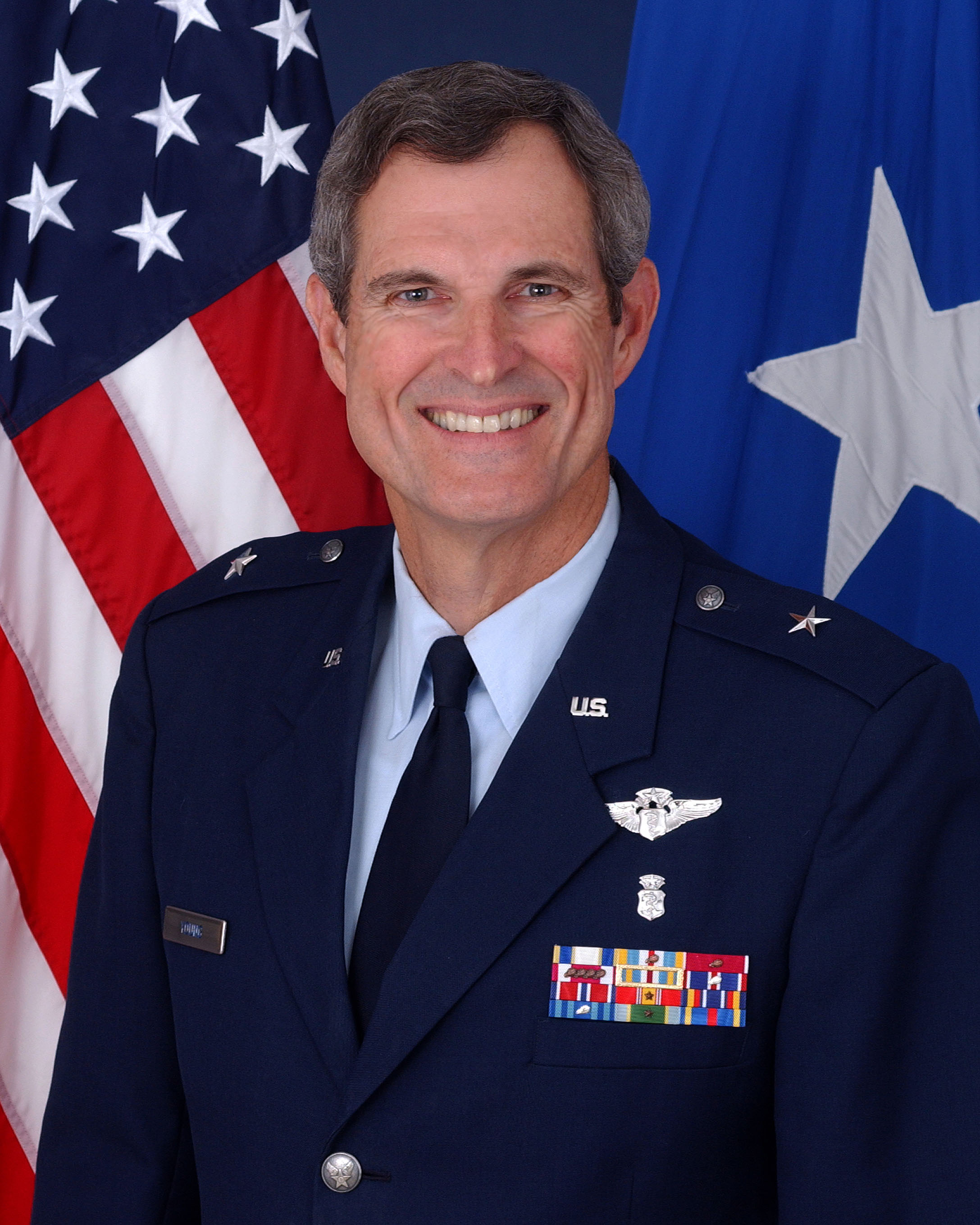
- Born: David G. Young III; Camp Cooke
- Military career
- Allegiance: United States of America
- Rank: Brigadier general
- Commands: United States Air Force

David G. Young III was a brigadier general in the United States Air Force.

== Biography ==
Young was born at Camp Cooke. He obtained a B.A. from the University of Pennsylvania and a M.D. from the University of Southern California. In 1980 he completed his residency at the Medical College of Wisconsin. While at the University of Pennsylvania he was a member of the College Boat Club and was National Champion in 1968, 1969, and 1971. He was a member of the U.S. Rowing Team in 1971.

== Career ==
Young joined the Air Force in 1980. In 1986 he was named chief of the Clinical Medicine Division of Air Training Command. Later he was named vice commander of the medical center at Keesler Air Force Base. In 1998 he was named Command Surgeon of Pacific Air Forces. He was given command of the 59th Medical Wing in 2005. Young's retirement was effective as of January 1, 2008.

Awards he has received include the Air Force Distinguished Service Medal, the Defense Superior Service Medal with oak leaf cluster, the Legion of Merit with oak leaf cluster, the Meritorious Service Medal with four oak leaf clusters, the Joint Meritorious Unit Award, the Outstanding Unit Award with silver oak leaf cluster, the Organizational Excellence Award, the National Defense Service Medal with service star, the Global War on Terrorism Service Medal, the Air Force Longevity Service Award with silver oak leaf cluster, the Small Arms Expert Marksmanship Ribbon with service star, and the Air Force Training Ribbon.
