= Ceibwr =

Medieval land division in Glamorgan, Wales

Ceibwr (Old Welsh: Kibwr, English: Kibbor) is a historic Welsh commote and later hundred in Glamorgan, South Wales.

== Cwmwd Ceibwr ==
Located in the cantref of Senghenydd (Old Welsh: Kantref Breinyawl) within the Kingdom of Morgannwg, the commote was defined as the lands located between the Cefn Onn ridge and the sea.

Each medieval Welsh kingdom was divided into cantrefi, which were further subdivided into "cymydau" (commotes). This required every commote to have its own royal court. This administrative centre of Ceibwr is unknown, but historians have suggested that the "Llys faen" (English: Stone Court) was the eponym for the village of Lisvane. Roath has also been suggested as the ancient centre as it has been readily identified as the Ratostabius noted in this locality by Ptolomey in his 2nd-century work Geographia.

== Hundred of Kibbor ==
The hundred of Kibbor, located within the county Glamorgan

The commote was recreated as an English-style hundred by the Laws in Wales Acts 1535. The hundred of Kibbor consisted of the seven parishes that made up the ancient commote, but with the addition of the parish around the cathedral city of Llandaff:

- Caerau
- Cardiff St John
- Cardiff St Mary
- Llanedeyrn
- Llanishen
- Lisvane
- Roath
- Llandaff
