= Pontlottyn =

Coordinates: 51°44′N 3°18′W

Pontlottyn: Welsh: Pontlotyn
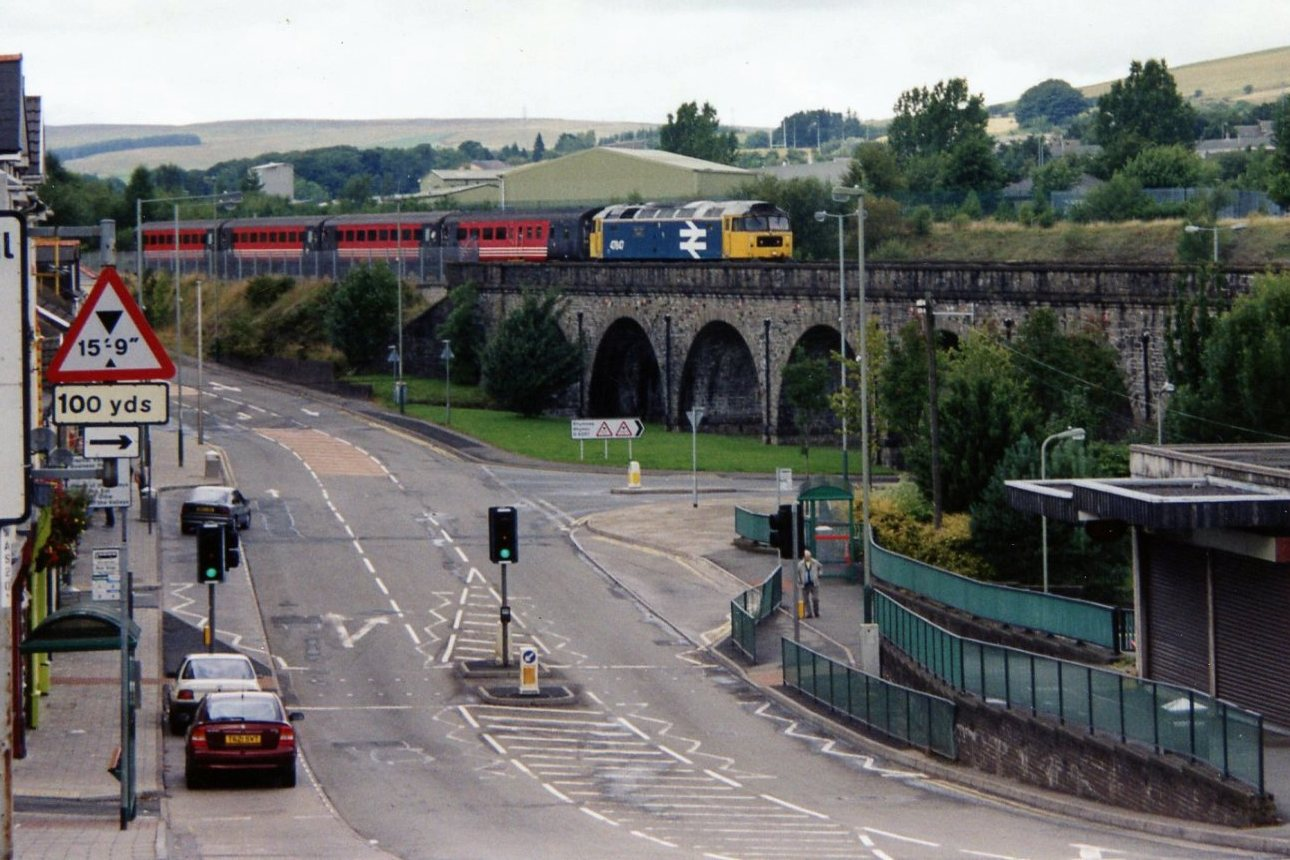
- Pontlottyn, with the railway viaduct visible in the background
- Population: 1,924 (2011 ward)
- OS grid reference: SO107058
- Principal area: Caerphilly
- Preserved county: Gwent
- Country: Wales
- Sovereign state: United Kingdom
- Post town: Bargoed
- Postcode district: CF81
- Dialling code: 01685
- Police: Gwent
- Fire: South Wales
- Ambulance: Welsh
- UK Parliament: Blaenau Gwent and Rhymney

Pontlottyn (Welsh: Pontlotyn) is a village located in the county borough of Caerphilly, within the historic county boundaries of Glamorgan, Wales. It is sited just to the south of Rhymney, and to the west of the Rhymney River.

== History ==
Pontlottyn, initially part of Lower Rhymney, was born and grew from the enterprise of the coal and ironmasters and as many as thirty-one pits and levels existed between these two villages before 1835. This industrialisation brought a huge increase in population with rural Welsh workers and particularly Irish immigrants flowing in, attracted by the promise of rich earnings from the growing iron industry.

It was well known for its neighbouring collieries, which employed nearly the entire local population in the early 20th century.

George "Honey Boy" Evans was born here, in 1870.

Edward Thomas Chapman, a miner who won the Victoria Cross during World War II, was born at Pontlottyn in January 1920.

== Facilities ==
Pontlottyn has a chemist, post office, 4 fast food establishments, general shops (serving convenience and specialist goods), local cafes, 2 hairdressers, and 3 pubs with some serving food.

The village is served by Pontlottyn railway station.

== See also ==
- Rhymney Valley
