= 2008 Vale of Glamorgan Council election =

Election

Results of the 2008 Vale of Glamorgan Council election

The 2008 Vale of Glamorgan Council election took place on Thursday 1 May 2008 to elect members of Vale of Glamorgan Council in Wales. This was the same day as other United Kingdom local elections. The previous full council election was in 2004 and the next full elections were on 3 May 2012.

== Election result ==
Forty-seven seats were up for election and the Conservative Party managed to win an overall majority, where previously no party was in overall control. The result took place in the context of Gordon Brown's Labour government falling to its lowest polling since the 1960s, with the Conservatives winning control of eleven other councils in England and Wales.

Vale of Glamorgan Council Election 2008
Party	Seats	Gains	Losses	Net gain/loss	Seats %	Votes %	Votes	+/−
Conservative	25	5	0	+5	53.2	43.4	18,532	
Labour	13	2	5	-3	27.7	26.5	11,331	
Plaid Cymru	6	0	2	-2	12.7	12.8	8,932	
Llantwit First Independent	3	3	0	+3	6.4	4.4	1,894	
Liberal Democrats	0	0	0	0	0.0	2.1	878	
Independent	0	0	3	-3	0.0	1.5	659	
UKIP	0	0	0	0	0.0	1.0	413	
Liberal	0	0	0	0	0.0	0.2	73	

== Ward results ==
Ward	Political group	Councillor	Change from last election
Baruc (Barry)	Plaid Cymru	Nicholas Hodges	Plaid Cymru hold
Baruc (Barry)	Plaid Cymru	Steffan Wiliam	Plaid Cymru hold
Buttrills (Barry)	Labour	Margaret Alexander	Labour hold
Buttrills (Barry)	Labour	Stuart Egan	Labour hold
Cadoc (Barry)	Labour	Fred Johnson	Labour hold
Cadoc (Barry)	Labour	Anne Moore	Labour hold
Cadoc (Barry)	Labour	Neil Moore	Labour hold
Castleland (Barry)	Labour	Pamela Drake	Labour gain from Plaid Cymru
Castleland (Barry)	Labour	Christopher Elmore	Labour gain from Plaid Cymru
Cornerswell (Penarth)	Conservative	John Fraser	Conservative gain from Labour
Cornerswell (Penarth)	Conservative	Dorothy Turner	Conservative gain from Labour
Court (Barry)	Labour	Richard Bertin	Labour hold
Court (Barry)	Labour	Bronwen Brooks	Labour hold
Cowbridge	Conservative	Geoffrey Cox	Conservative hold
Cowbridge	Conservative	Valerie Ellis	Conservative hold
Cowbridge	Conservative	Hunter Jarvie	Conservative hold
Dinas Powys	Plaid Cymru	Val Hartrey	Plaid Cymru hold
Dinas Powys	Plaid Cymru	Margaret Randall	Plaid Cymru hold
Dinas Powys	Plaid Cymru	Keith Hatton	Plaid Cymru hold
Dinas Powys	Plaid Cymru	Christopher Williams	Plaid Cymru hold
Dyfan (Barry)	Conservative	Marguerita Wright	Conservative gain from Labour
Dyfan (Barry)	Conservative	Katharine Kemp	Conservative gain from Labour
Gibbonsdown (Barry)	Labour	Rob Curtis	Labour hold
Gibbonsdown (Barry)	Labour	Margaret Wilkinson	Labour hold
Illtyd (Barry)	Conservative	Terry Hampton	Conservative hold
Illtyd (Barry)	Conservative	Janice Charles	Conservative hold
Illtyd (Barry)	Conservative	Emlyn Williams	Conservative hold
Llandough	Conservative	Colin Osborne	Conservative hold
Llandow and Ewenny	Conservative	Colin Vaughan	Conservative hold
Llantwit Major	Llantwit First Independent	Gwyn John	Llantwit First gain from Independent ^{[a]}
Llantwit Major	Llantwit First Independent	Sally Bagstaff	Llantwit First gain from Independent ^{[a]}
Llantwit Major	Llantwit First Independent	Eric Hacker	Llantwit First gain from Independent ^{[a]}
Llantwit Major	Conservative	John Clifford	Conservative hold
Peterston-Super-Ely	Conservative	Rhodri Traherne	Conservative hold
Plymouth (Penarth)	Conservative	Maureen Owen	Conservative hold
Plymouth (Penarth)	Conservative	Clive Williams	Conservative hold
Rhoose	Conservative	Jeff James	Conservative hold
Rhoose	Conservative	Gordon Kemp	Conservative hold
St Athan	Conservative	John Thomas	Conservative hold
St Augustine's (Penarth)	Conservative	Paul Church	Conservative hold
St Augustine's (Penarth)	Conservative	Sophie Williams	Conservative gain from Labour
St Brides Major	Conservative	Audrey Preston	Conservative hold
Stanwell (Penarth)	Labour	Janice Birch	Labour hold
Stanwell (Penarth)	Labour	Mark Wilson	Labour hold
Sully	Conservative	Sarah Sharpe	Conservative hold
Sully	Conservative	Anthony Ernest	Conservative hold
Wenvoe	Conservative	Jonathan Bird	Conservative hold

^{[a]} Councillors previously elected as Independent. Llantwit First Independents registered as a new political party in 2007
