= Cardiff South and Penarth (UK Parliament constituency) =

UK Parliament constituency (since 1983)

Coordinates: 51.469°N 3.127°W

- Borough constituency for the House of Commons
- Interactive map of boundaries from 2024
- Boundary of Cardiff South and Penarth in Wales
- Preserved county: South Glamorgan
- Population: 107,455 (2011 census)
- Electorate: 72,269 (March 2020)

Current constituency
- Created: 1983
- Member of Parliament: Stephen Doughty (Labour Co-op)
- Seats: One
- Created from: Cardiff South East & parts of Barry and Monmouth

Overlaps
- Senedd: Caerdydd Penarth

Cardiff South and Penarth (Welsh: De Caerdydd a Phenarth) is a constituency (Note: A borough constituency in terms of election expenses and type of returning officer) created in 1983 represented in the House of Commons of the UK Parliament since 2012 by Stephen Doughty, a Labour Co-op MP, who has served as Minister of State for Europe, North America and Overseas Territories since July 2024.

The constituency retained its name, but with altered boundaries, as part of the 2023 review of Westminster constituencies and under the June 2023 final recommendations of the Boundary Commission for Wales for the 2024 general election.

== Boundaries ==
Map of boundaries 2010–2024

1983–2010: The City of Cardiff wards of Butetown, Grangetown, Llanrumney, Rumney, Splott, and Trowbridge; and the Borough of Vale of Glamorgan wards of Alexandra (became Plymouth and St Augustine's from 2004), Cornerswell, Llandough, and Stanwell.

2010–2024: As above with the addition of Sully from the Vale of Glamorgan seat.

2024–present: The City and County of Cardiff wards of Butetown, Cathays, Grangetown, and Splott; and the County Borough of the Vale of Glamorgan wards Cornerswell, Dinas Powys, Llandough, Plymouth, St Augustine's, Stanwell, and Sully.

The seat gained Cathays from the abolished Cardiff Central constituency, and Dinas Powys from the Vale of Glamorgan constituency, offset by the loss of Llanrumney, Rumney, and Trowbridge to the new Cardiff East constituency.

== History ==
=== Creation ===
Prior to 1983 Penarth had been part of the abolished Barry constituency, represented by the Conservative backbencher Sir Raymond Gower. Most of the electorate of the new constituency had previously fallen into the abolished seat of Cardiff South East, represented by former Prime Minister, James Callaghan.

=== Political history ===
Cardiff South and Penarth has had three MPs since its creation, containing some very safe Labour wards from Cardiff such as Butetown, Grangetown and Splott, and several wards from the neighbouring borough of the Vale of Glamorgan, with Penarth mostly favourable to Labour, but with some areas such as Plymouth and Sully in the southern end of the seat where the Conservatives attracted more support. The first, elected at the 1983 general election, was the former Labour Prime Minister James Callaghan, who secured the seat with a 5.4% majority over Conservative David Tredinnick. Callaghan had immediately prior to the dissolution of Parliament, represented Cardiff South East. Callaghan first became an MP at the 1945 general election, for Cardiff South.

The second MP was Alun Michael (Labour and Co-operative Party) who served 25 years from 1987 before choosing to stand down in 2012. Michael's affiliation with the Co-operative Party did not appear on ballot papers at the 2010 general election because the Electoral Commission ruled that any joint candidates who wanted the names of both their parties included on the ballot paper could not also display the Labour red rose logo. Michael opted to drop the reference to the Co-operative Party but after the election denounced the ruling as "an outrageous piece of incompetence by the Electoral Commission". Michael briefly became Secretary of State for Wales in 1998. Michael held the seat at the 2010 general election with a majority of 10.6% following a 6% swing to the Conservative candidate.

In 2012, Michael was selected by the Labour and Co-operative Parties as their candidate for the election of a Police and Crime Commissioner for the South Wales Police force area and announced he would be standing down from Parliament.

At a by-election held on 15 November 2012, Labour's decline was reversed coupled with very low turnout (down 38.2% on the previous election). Labour's Stephen Doughty succeeded Alun Michael winning 47.3% of the overall vote. This was an increase (in share-of-the-vote terms) on Michael's 2010 performance. However, in terms of actual votes cast (9,193 compared with 17,262 in 2010), it was Labour's lowest in this constituency. The 2015 result gave the seat the 83rd-smallest majority of Labour's 232 seats by percentage of majority. Labour's result in 2017 saw them secure their largest ever margin in the constituency in terms of raw votes.

=== Other parties ===
Five parties' candidates achieved more than the deposit-retaining threshold of 5% of the vote in 2015. The second-placed candidate has been a Conservative candidate since the seat was formed. The closest result was in 1983, when Callaghan won by 5.5% of the vote.

=== Turnout ===
Turnout at general elections has ranged between 77.2% in 1992 and 56.2% in 2005.

== Members of Parliament ==
Election	Member	Party
1983	James Callaghan	Labour
1987	Alun Michael	Labour and Co-operative
2012 by-election	Stephen Doughty	Labour and Co-operative

== Elections ==
=== Elections in the 1980s ===
General election 1983: Cardiff South and Penarth
Party	Candidate	Votes	%	±%
Labour	James Callaghan	17,448	41.3	
Conservative	David Tredinnick	15,172	35.9	
Liberal	Winston Roddick	8,816	20.8	
Plaid Cymru	Sian Edwards	673	1.6	
Freedom from World Domination	Benjamin Lewis	165	0.4	
Majority		2,276	5.4	
Turnout		42,274	71.0	
Registered electors		59,520		
Labour win (new seat)				

General election 1987: Cardiff South and Penarth
Party	Candidate	Votes	%	±%
Labour Co-op	Alun Michael	20,956	46.7	+5.4
Conservative	Gareth Neale	16,382	36.5	+0.6
Liberal	Jenny Randerson	6,900	15.4	−5.4
Plaid Cymru	Sian Edwards	599	1.3	−0.3
Majority		4,574	10.2	+4.8
Turnout		44,837	76.4	+5.4
Registered electors		58,714		
Labour Co-op hold		Swing	+1.5	

=== Elections in the 1990s ===
General election 1992: Cardiff South and Penarth
Party	Candidate	Votes	%	±%
Labour Co-op	Alun Michael	26,383	55.5	+8.8
Conservative	Thomas Jarvie	15,958	33.6	−2.9
Liberal	Prabhat Verma	3,707	7.8	−7.6
Plaid Cymru	Barbara Anglezarke	776	1.6	+0.3
Green	Lester Davey	676	1.4	N/A
Majority		10,425	21.9	+11.7
Turnout		47,500	77.2	+0.8
Registered electors		61,484		
Labour Co-op hold		Swing	+5.9	

General election 1997: Cardiff South and Penarth
Party	Candidate	Votes	%	±%
Labour Co-op	Alun Michael	22,647	53.4	−2.1
Conservative	Caroline E. Roberts	8,786	20.7	−12.9
Liberal Democrats	Simon J. Wakefield	3,964	9.3	+1.5
New Labour	John Foreman	3,942	9.3	N/A
Plaid Cymru	David B. L. Haswell	1,356	3.2	+1.6
Referendum	Phillip S. E. Morgan	1,211	2.9	N/A
Socialist	Mike K. Shepherd	344	0.8	N/A
Natural Law	Barbara Caves	170	0.4	N/A
Majority		13,861	32.7	+10.8
Turnout		42,420	68.3	−8.9
Registered electors		62,138		
Labour Co-op hold		Swing	+5.3	

=== Elections in the 2000s ===
General election 2001: Cardiff South and Penarth
Party	Candidate	Votes	%	±%
Labour Co-op	Alun Michael	20,094	56.2	+2.8
Conservative	Maureen Owen	7,807	21.8	+1.1
Liberal Democrats	Rodney Berman	4,572	12.8	+3.5
Plaid Cymru	Lila Haines	1,983	5.5	+2.3
UKIP	Justin Callan	501	1.4	N/A
Socialist Alliance	David Bartlett	427	1.2	N/A
ProLife Alliance	Anne Savoury	367	1.0	N/A
Majority		12,287	34.4	+1.7
Turnout		35,751	57.1	−11.2
Registered electors		62,627		
Labour Co-op hold		Swing	+0.8	

General election 2005: Cardiff South and Penarth
Party	Candidate	Votes	%	±%
Labour Co-op	Alun Michael	17,447	47.3	−8.9
Conservative	Victoria Green	8,210	22.2	+0.4
Liberal Democrats	Gavin Cox	7,529	20.4	+7.6
Plaid Cymru	Jason Toby	2,023	5.5	0.0
Green	John Matthews	729	2.0	N/A
UKIP	Jennie Tuttle	522	1.4	0.0
Socialist	David Bartlett	269	0.7	N/A
Independent	Andrew Taylor	104	0.3	N/A
Rainbow Dream Ticket	Catherine Taylor-Dawson	79	0.2	N/A
Majority		9,237	25.1	−9.3
Turnout		36,912	56.2	−0.9
Registered electors		65,786		
Labour Co-op hold		Swing	−4.7	

=== Elections in the 2010s ===
General election 2010: Cardiff South and Penarth
Party	Candidate	Votes	%	±%
Labour Co-op	Alun Michael	17,262	38.9	−7.7
Conservative	Simon Hoare	12,553	28.3	+4.4
Liberal Democrats	Dominic Hannigan	9,875	22.3	+2.4
Plaid Cymru	Farida Aslam	1,851	4.2	−1.1
UKIP	Simon Zeigler	1,145	2.6	+1.2
Independent	George Burke	648	1.5	N/A
Green	Matthew Townsend	554	1.2	−0.6
Christian	Clive Bate	285	0.6	N/A
Communist	Robert Griffiths	196	0.4	N/A
Majority		4,709	10.6	−14.4
Turnout		44,369	60.2	+2.0
Registered electors		73,707		
Labour Co-op hold		Swing	−6.0	

2012 Cardiff South and Penarth by-election
Party	Candidate	Votes	%	±%
Labour Co-op	Stephen Doughty	9,193	47.3	+8.4
Conservative	Craig Williams	3,859	19.9	−8.4
Liberal Democrats	Bablin Molik	2,103	10.8	−11.5
Plaid Cymru	Luke Nicholas	1,854	9.5	+5.3
UKIP	Simon Zeigler	1,179	6.1	+3.5
Green	Anthony Slaughter	800	4.1	+2.9
Socialist Labour	Andrew Jordan	235	1.2	N/A
Communist	Robert Griffiths	213	1.1	+0.7
Rejected ballots		135		
Majority		5,334	27.4	+16.8
Turnout		19,436	25.7	−34.5
Registered electors		76,764		
Labour Co-op hold		Swing	+8.4	

Of the 135 rejected ballots:

- 63 were either unmarked or it was uncertain who the vote was for.
- 69 voted for more than one candidate.
- 3 had writing or a mark by which the voter could be identified.

General election 2015: Cardiff South and Penarth
Party	Candidate	Votes	%	±%
Labour Co-op	Stephen Doughty	19,966	42.8	+3.9
Conservative	Emma Warman	12,513	26.8	−1.5
UKIP	John Rees-Evans	6,423	13.8	+11.2
Plaid Cymru	Ben Foday	3,443	7.4	+3.2
Liberal Democrats	Nigel Howells	2,318	5.0	−17.3
Green	Anthony Slaughter	1,746	3.7	+2.5
TUSC	Ross Saunders	258	0.6	N/A
Rejected ballots		121		
Majority		7,453	16.0	+5.4
Turnout		46,667	61.4	+1.2
Registered electors		76,006		
Labour Co-op hold		Swing	+2.7	

Of the 121 rejected ballots:

- 82 were either unmarked or it was uncertain who the vote was for.
- 35 voted for more than one candidate.
- 4 had writing or a mark by which the voter could be identified.

General election 2017: Cardiff South and Penarth
Party	Candidate	Votes	%	±%
Labour Co-op	Stephen Doughty	30,182	59.5	+16.7
Conservative	Bill Rees	15,318	30.2	+3.4
Plaid Cymru	Ian Titherington	2,162	4.3	−3.1
Liberal Democrats	Emma Sands	1,430	2.8	−2.2
UKIP	Andrew Bevan	942	1.9	−11.9
Green	Anthony Slaughter	532	1.0	−2.7
Pirate	Jebediah Hedges	170	0.3	N/A
Rejected ballots		107		
Majority		14,864	29.3	+13.3
Turnout		50,736	66.3	+4.9
Registered electors		76,499		
Labour Co-op hold		Swing	+6.7	

Of the 107 rejected ballots:

- 76 were either unmarked or it was uncertain who the vote was for.
- 29 voted for more than one candidate.
- 2 had writing or a mark by which the voter could be identified.

General election 2019: Cardiff South and Penarth
Party	Candidate	Votes	%	±%
Labour Co-op	Stephen Doughty	27,382	54.1	−5.4
Conservative	Phillippa Broom	14,645	29.0	−1.2
Liberal Democrats	Dan Schmeising	2,985	5.9	+3.1
Plaid Cymru	Nasir Adam	2,386	4.7	+0.4
Brexit Party	Tim Price	1,999	4.0	N/A
Green	Ken Barker	1,182	2.3	+1.3
Rejected ballots		160		
Majority		12,737	25.1	−3.8
Turnout		50,579	64.2	−2.1
Registered electors		78,837		
Labour Co-op hold		Swing	−2.1	

Of the 160 rejected ballots:

- 132 were either unmarked or it was uncertain who the vote was for.
- 27 voted for more than one candidate.
- 1 had writing or mark by which the voter could be identified.

2019 notional result (Note: Estimate of the 2019 general election result as if the revised boundaries recommended under the 2023 boundary review were in place)
Party	Vote	%
Labour	27,030	53.7
Conservative	15,179	30.1
Liberal Democrats	3,528	7.0
Plaid Cymru	2,091	4.2
Brexit Party	1,389	2.8
Green Party	1,153	2.3
Majority	11,851	23.5
Turnout	50,370	69.7
Electorate	72,269	

=== Elections in the 2020s ===
General election 2024: Cardiff South and Penarth
Party	Candidate	Votes	%	±%
Labour Co-op	Stephen Doughty	17,428	44.5	−9.2
Green	Anthony Slaughter	5,661	14.5	+12.2
Conservative	Ellis Smith	5,459	13.9	−16.2
Reform	Simon Llewellyn	4,493	11.5	+8.7
Plaid Cymru	Sharifah Rahman (Note: Plaid Cymru withdrew their support for Rahman on 7 June 2024, after nominations closed the same day, so she still appeared as the Plaid Cymru candidate on the ballot paper.)	3,227	8.2	+4.0
Liberal Democrats	Alex Wilson	2,908	7.4	+0.4
Majority		11,767	30.0	+6.5
Turnout		39,176	54.0	−15.7
Registered electors		72,613		
Labour Co-op hold		Swing	−10.7	

== See also ==
- Cardiff South and Penarth (Senedd constituency)
- List of parliamentary constituencies in South Glamorgan
- List of UK Parliament constituencies in Wales

== Notes ==
Parliament of the United Kingdom
Preceded by Dagenham	Constituency represented by the father of the House; 1983–1987	Succeeded by Castle Point
