= 2012 Vale of Glamorgan Council election =

2012 Welsh local government election

Results of the 2012 Vale of Glamorgan Council election

The 2012 Vale of Glamorgan Council election took place on Thursday 3 May 2012 to elect members of Vale of Glamorgan Council in Wales. This was the same day as other United Kingdom local elections. The previous full council election took place on 1 May 2008 and the next one took place on 4 May 2017.

== Election result ==
The Conservatives lost control of the council after losing 14 seats. The Labour Party became the largest grouping, but failed to win enough seats for an overall majority. This meant they could either run a minority administration or form a coalition with one of the smaller political groups. Conservative leader of the council, Gordon Kemp, lost his Rhoose seat to an independent candidate after a recount. He blamed his party's poor performance on the UK Conservative coalition government.

Vale of Glamorgan Council Election 2012
Party	Seats	Gains	Losses	Net gain/loss	Seats %	Votes %	Votes	+/−
Labour	22	10	1	+9	46.8	34.8	13,871	+8.3
Conservative	11	0	14	-14	23.4	31.1	12,431	-12.3
Plaid Cymru	6	0	0	0	12.7	15.4	6,150	-5.5
Independent	3	3	0	+3	6.4	10.2	4,087	+8.7
Llantwit First Independent	4	1	0	+1	8.5	5.2	2,068	+0.8
UKIP	1	1	0	+1	2.1	1.6	633	+0.6
Green	0			0	0.0	1.1	452	New
Liberal Democrats	0			0	0.0	0.5	217	-1.6
Liberal	-	-	-	-	-	-	-	-0.2

== Ward results ==
Ward	Political group	Councillor	Change from last election
Baruc (Barry)	Plaid Cymru	Steffan Wiliam	Plaid Cymru hold
Baruc (Barry)	Plaid Cymru	Nicholas Hodges	Plaid Cymru hold
Buttrills (Barry)	Labour	Margaret Alexander	Labour hold
Buttrills (Barry)	Labour	Stuart Egan	Labour hold
Cadoc (Barry)	Labour	Anne Moore	Labour hold
Cadoc (Barry)	Labour	Fred Johnson	Labour hold
Cadoc (Barry)	Labour	Neil Moore	Labour hold
Castleland (Barry)	Labour	Chris Elmore	Labour hold
Castleland (Barry)	Labour	Pamela Drake	Labour hold
Cornerswell (Penarth)	Labour	Rhiannon Birch	Labour gain from Conservative
Cornerswell (Penarth)	Labour	Peter King	Labour gain from Conservative
Court (Barry)	Labour	Bronwen Brooks	Labour hold
Court (Barry)	Independent	Richard Bertin	Independent gain from Labour
Cowbridge	Conservative	Geoffrey Cox	Conservative hold
Cowbridge	Conservative	Thomas Jarvie	Conservative hold
Cowbridge	Conservative	Andrew Parker	Conservative hold
Dinas Powys	Plaid Cymru	Christopher Franks	Plaid Cymru hold
Dinas Powys	Plaid Cymru	Valerie Hartrey	Plaid Cymru hold
Dinas Powys	Plaid Cymru	Keith Hatton	Plaid Cymru hold
Dinas Powys	Plaid Cymru	Christopher Williams	Plaid Cymru hold
Dyfan (Barry)	Labour	Claire Curtis	Labour gain from Conservative
Dyfan (Barry)	Labour	Anthony Powell	Labour gain from Conservative
Gibbonsdown (Barry)	Labour	Rob Curtis	Labour hold
Gibbonsdown (Barry)	Labour	Margaret Wilkinson	Labour hold
Illtyd (Barry)	Labour	Howard Hamilton	Labour gain from Conservative
Illtyd (Barry)	Labour	John Drysdale	Labour gain from Conservative
Illtyd (Barry)	Labour	Rhona Probert	Labour gain from Conservative
Llandough	Labour	Kate Edmunds	Labour gain from Conservative
Llandow and Ewenny	Conservative	Ray Thomas	Conservative hold
Llantwit Major	Llantwit First Independent	Gwyn John	Llantwit First Independent hold
Llantwit Major	Llantwit First Independent	Eric Hacker	Llantwit First Independent hold
Llantwit Major	Llantwit First Independent	Edward Williams	Llantwit First Independent hold
Llantwit Major	Llantwit First Independent	Keith Geary	Llantwit First Independent gain from Conservative
Peterston-super-Ely	Conservative	Rhodri Traherne	Conservative hold
Plymouth (Penarth)	Conservative	Maureen Owen	Conservative hold
Plymouth (Penarth)	Conservative	Clive Williams	Conservative hold
Rhoose	Independent	Philip Clarke	Independent gain from Conservative
Rhoose	Conservative	Jeff James	Conservative hold
St Athan	Conservative	John Thomas	Conservative hold
St Augustine's (Penarth)	Labour	Lis Burnett	Labour gain from Conservative
St Augustine's (Penarth)	Labour	Gwyn Roberts	Labour gain from Conservative
St Brides Major	Conservative	Audrey Preston	Conservative hold
Stanwell (Penarth)	Labour	Janice Birch	Labour hold
Stanwell (Penarth)	Labour	Mark Wilson	Labour hold
Sully	Independent	Bob Penrose	Independent gain from Conservative
Sully	UKIP	Kevin Mahoney	UKIP gain from Conservative
Wenvoe	Conservative	Jonathan Bird	Conservative hold

== By-elections 2012-2017 ==
Buttrills (2012)

Caused by the death of Labour councillor Margaret Alexander, the by-election took place on 2 August 2012 with the vacant seat taken from Labour by Plaid Cymru's Ian Johnson.

Llantwit Major (2015)

Caused by the death in January of Llantwit First councillor Keith Geary, the by-election took place on 26 March 2015, with the vacant seat won by 12 votes by Tony Bennett for the Conservatives.

Rhoose (2016)

Caused by the death of Independent councillor Paul Clarke in a motorcycle accident. The by-election, on 30 June 2016, was won by Independent candidate Adam Riley (with the Conservative's ex-council leader Gordon Kemp in second place).

Gibbonsdown (2016)

The by-election in this Barry ward was caused by the resignation of Labour councillor Rob Curtis and took place on 3 November 2016. It was won by Labour candidate Julie Aviet, with 47.9% of the vote.
