= 2017 Vale of Glamorgan Council election =

2017 Welsh local government election

Results of the 2017 Vale of Glamorgan Council election

The council's composition after the elections

The 2017 Vale of Glamorgan Council election took place on Thursday 4 May 2017 to elect members of Vale of Glamorgan Council in Wales. There were 47 council seats available, across 23 wards. This was the same day as other United Kingdom local elections.

The previous full council election took place on 3 May 2012, with the next full council election taking place on 5 May 2022.

== Election result ==
In winning 23 seats the Conservatives had a surprising resurgence, taking back the council from the previous coalition of Labour councillors and Llantwit First Independents. The Conservatives were one seat short of an overall majority. Labour-held wards such as Barry's Dyfan and Illtyd were taken by the Tories, as was the previous Plaid Cymru stronghold of Dinas Powys.

Vale of Glamorgan Council Election 2017
| Party | Seats | Gains | Losses | Net gain/loss | Seats % | Votes % | Votes | +/− |
|---|---|---|---|---|---|---|---|---|
| Conservative | 23 | 12 | 1 | +11 | 48.9 | 41.7 | | +10.6 |
| Labour | 14 | 1 | 8 | -7 | 29.8 | 24.1 | | -10.7 |
| Plaid Cymru | 4 | 1 | 4 | -3 | 8.5 | 14.7 | | -0.7 |
| Llantwit First Independent | 4 | 1 | 0 | +1 | 8.5 | 7.8 | | +2.6 |
| Independent | 2 | 1 | 2 | -1 | 4.3 | 8.1 | | -2.1 |
| Green | 0 | 0 | 0 | 0 | 0.0 | 2.0 | 1,607 | +0.9 |
| Liberal Democrats | 0 | 0 | 0 | 0 | 0.0 | 0.8 | | +0.3 |
| UKIP | 0 | 0 | 1 | -1 | 0.0 | 0.3 | 112 | -1.3 |
| Pirate | 0 | 0 | 0 | 0 | 0.0 | 0.1 | 75 | +0.1 |

== Ward overview ==
| Ward | Political group | Councillor | Change from last election |
|---|---|---|---|
| Baruc (Barry) | Plaid Cymru | Nic Hodges | Plaid Cymru hold |
| Baruc (Barry) | Plaid Cymru | Steffan Williams | Plaid Cymru hold |
| Buttrills (Barry) | Labour | Owen Griffiths | Labour hold |
| Buttrills (Barry) | Plaid Cymru | Ian Johnson | Plaid Cymru hold ^{[a]} |
| Cadoc (Barry) | Labour | Anne Moore | Labour hold |
| Cadoc (Barry) | Labour | Neil Moore | Labour hold |
| Cadoc (Barry) | Conservative | Rachel Nugent-Finn | Conservative gain from Labour |
| Castleland (Barry) | Plaid Cymru | Millie Collins | Plaid Cymru gain from Labour |
| Castleland (Barry) | Labour | Pamela Drake | Labour hold |
| Cornerswell (Penarth) | Labour | Rhiannon Birch | Labour hold |
| Cornerswell (Penarth) | Labour | Peter King | Labour hold |
| Court (Barry) | Labour | Bronwen Brooks | Labour hold |
| Court (Barry) | Labour | Sandra Perkes | Labour gain from Independent |
| Cowbridge | Conservative | Geoffrey Cox | Conservative hold |
| Cowbridge | Conservative | Thomas Jarvie | Conservative hold |
| Cowbridge | Conservative | Andrew Parker | Conservative hold |
| Dinas Powys | Conservative | Andy Robertson | Conservative gain from Plaid Cymru |
| Dinas Powys | Conservative | Robert Crowley | Conservative gain from Plaid Cymru |
| Dinas Powys | Conservative | Steve Griffiths | Conservative gain from Plaid Cymru |
| Dinas Powys | Conservative | Vince Driscoll | Conservative gain from Plaid Cymru |
| Dyfan (Barry) | Conservative | Vincent Bailey | Conservative gain from Labour |
| Dyfan (Barry) | Conservative | Leighton Rowlands | Conservative gain from Labour |
| Gibbonsdown (Barry) | Labour | Julie Aviet | Labour hold |
| Gibbonsdown (Barry) | Labour | Margaret Wilkinson | Labour hold |
| Illtyd (Barry) | Conservative | Janice Charles | Conservative gain from Labour |
| Illtyd (Barry) | Conservative | Tony Hampton | Conservative gain from Labour |
| Illtyd (Barry) | Conservative | Marguerita Wright | Conservative gain from Labour |
| Llandough | Conservative | George Carroll | Conservative gain from Labour |
| Llandow and Ewenny | Conservative | Christine Cave | Conservative hold |
| Llantwit Major | Llantwit First Independent | Sally Hanks | Llantwit First Independent hold |
| Llantwit Major | Llantwit First Independent | Gwyn John | Llantwit First Independent hold |
| Llantwit Major | Llantwit First Independent | Jayne Norman | Llantwit First Independent hold |
| Llantwit Major | Llantwit First Independent | Eddie Williams | Llantwit First Independent gain from Conservative ^{[b]} |
| Peterston-super-Ely | Conservative | Michael Morgan | Conservative hold |
| Plymouth (Penarth) | Conservative | Ben Gray | Conservative hold |
| Plymouth (Penarth) | Conservative | Kathryn McCaffer | Conservative hold |
| Rhoose | Conservative | Gordon Kemp | Conservative hold |
| Rhoose | Conservative | Matthew Lloyd | Conservative gain from Independent |
| St Athan | Conservative | John Thomas | Conservative hold |
| St Augustine's (Penarth) | Labour | Sivaruby Sivagnanam | Labour hold |
| St Augustine's (Penarth) | Labour | Neil Thomas | Labour hold |
| St Brides Major | Conservative | Stewart Edwards | Conservative hold |
| Stanwell (Penarth) | Labour | Mark Wilson | Labour hold |
| Stanwell (Penarth) | Labour | Lis Burnett | Labour hold |
| Sully | Independent | Bob Penrose | Independent hold |
| Sully | Independent | Kevin Mahoney | Independent gain from UKIP ^{[c]} |
| Wenvoe | Conservative | Jonathan Bird | Conservative hold |

^{[a]} Plaid Cymru had won a seat from Labour at a by-election on 2 August 2012
^{[b]} The Conservatives had won a seat from the Llantwit First Independents at a by-election on 26 March 2015
^{[c]} Cllr Mahoney was elected in 2012 for UKIP but re-designated himself as Independent in February 2016

== Ward results ==
These are the full results.

=== Baruc (two seats) ===
Baruc 2017
| Party | Candidate | Votes | % | ±% |
|---|---|---|---|---|
| Plaid Cymru | Nic Hodges* | 1,137 | | |
| Plaid Cymru | Steffan Wiliam* | 1,053 | | |
| Conservative | Paul James | 978 | | |
| Conservative | Victoria Roberts | 929 | | |
| Labour | Brian Mayne | 616 | | |
| Turnout | | | | |
| Plaid Cymru hold | | Swing | | |
| Plaid Cymru hold | | Swing | | |

=== Buttrills (two seats) ===
Buttrills 2017
| Party | Candidate | Votes | % | ±% |
|---|---|---|---|---|
| Plaid Cymru | Ian James Johnson | 709 | | |
| Labour | Owen Griffiths | 664 | | |
| Labour | Susan Lloyd-Selby | 642 | | |
| Plaid Cymru | Mark Jonathan Hooper | 592 | | |
| Conservative | Louis Dawe | 421 | | |
| Conservative | Evarard Kerslake | 352 | | |

=== Cadoc (two seats) ===
Cadoc 2017
| Party | Candidate | Votes | % | ±% |
|---|---|---|---|---|
| Labour | Anne Moore * | 966 | | |
| Labour | Neil Moore * | 928 | | |
| Conservative | Rachel Nugent-Finn | 912 | | |
| Conservative | Corrie Driscoll | 895 | | |
| Labour | Michaela Richardson | 894 | | |
| Conservative | Howard Wright | 778 | | |
| Plaid Cymru | Larry Bufton | 437 | | |
| Plaid Cymru | Matthew Morgan | 364 | | |
| Plaid Cymru | Janet Johnson | 357 | | |
| Independent | Ade Pitman | 118 | | |
| Turnout | | | | |
| Labour hold | | Swing | | |
| Labour hold | | Swing | | |
| Conservative gain from Labour | | Swing | | |

=== Castleland (two seats) ===
Castleland 2017
| Party | Candidate | Votes | % | ±% |
|---|---|---|---|---|
| Labour | Pamela Drake * | 480 | | |
| Plaid Cymru | Millie Collins | 453 | | |
| Plaid Cymru | Barry Shaw | 450 | | |
| Labour | Helen Payne | 411 | | |
| Conservative | Peter Woodford | 163 | | |
| Green | Derek Cozens | 139 | | |
| Conservative | Jane Burrows | 135 | | |
| Pirate | Jebediah Hedges | 35 | | |
| Turnout | | | | |
| Labour hold | | Swing | | |
| Plaid Cymru gain from Labour | | Swing | | |

=== Cornerswell (two seats) ===
Cornerswell 2017
| Party | Candidate | Votes | % | ±% |
|---|---|---|---|---|
| Labour | Rhiannon Mary BIRCH | 829 | | |
| Labour | Peter Graham KING | 705 | | |
| Conservative | Ken LLOYD | 671 | | |
| Conservative | Dorothy Marianne TURNER | 583 | | |
| Plaid Cymru | Lewis GREENAWAY | 319 | | |
| Plaid Cymru | David Rhys WILTON | 267 | | |
| Liberal Democrats | Martyn David DRANFIELD | 148 | | |
| Green | Tom BLENKINSOP | 122 | | |

=== Court (two seats) ===
Court 2017
| Party | Candidate | Votes | % | ±% |
|---|---|---|---|---|
| Labour | Bronwen Ellen Brooks* | 539 | | |
| Labour | Sandra Davies Perkes | 463 | | |
| Independent | Richard Joel Bertin* | 419 | | |
| Independent | Andy Griffiths | 271 | | |
| Conservative | Robert Louis Charles Fisher | 204 | | |
| Conservative | Jonathan Wignall | 165 | | |
| Green | Stephen Ross David-Barker | 90 | | |

=== Cowbridge (three seats) ===
Cowbridge 2017
| Party | Candidate | Votes | % | ±% |
|---|---|---|---|---|
| Conservative | Geoffrey Addis COX | 1807 | | |
| Conservative | Thomas Hunter JARVIE | 1691 | | |
| Conservative | Andrew Carey PARKER | 1551 | | |
| Independent | Nicola Christine THOMAS | 657 | | |
| Labour | Jack HAWKINS | 544 | | |
| Plaid Cymru | Huw LLEWELLYN-MORGAN | 511 | | |
| Plaid Cymru | Nicola Jane BRANSON | 340 | | |
| Plaid Cymru | Shirley Ann HODGES | 290 | | |

=== Dinas Powys (four seats) ===
Dinas Powys 2017
| Party | Candidate | Votes | % | ±% |
|---|---|---|---|---|
| Conservative | Robert Crowley | 1425 | | |
| Conservative | Vince Driscoll | 1420 | | |
| Conservative | Steve Griffiths | 1385 | | |
| Conservative | Andy Robertson | 1303 | | |
| Plaid Cymru | Chris Franks * | 1270 | | |
| Plaid Cymru | Val Hartrey * | 1100 | | |
| Plaid Cymru | Keith Hatton * | 909 | | |
| Plaid Cymru | Richard Grigg | 806 | | |
| Labour | Jill Davies | 565 | | |
| Independent | Christopher John Williams * | 507 | | |
| Independent | John Maitland-Evans | 438 | | |
| Labour | Trevor George Robert Saunders | 431 | | |
| Labour | Anthony Lewis | 413 | | |
| Labour | John Boddy | 366 | | |
| Independent | Thomas Maitland-Evans | 365 | | |
| Green | Hilary May | 323 | | |

=== Dyfan (two seats) ===
Dyfan 2017
| Party | Candidate | Votes | % | ±% |
|---|---|---|---|---|
| Conservative | Vincent James BAILEY | 851 | | |
| Conservative | Leighton Owen ROWLANDS | 837 | | |
| Labour | Emma Samantha PRITCHARD | 664 | | |
| Labour | Anthony Greldon POWELL | 658 | | |
| Plaid Cymru | Leslie James KELLAWAY | 245 | | |
| Plaid Cymru | Paul BRIDGEMAN | 214 | | |

=== Gibbonsdown (two seats) ===
Gibbonsdown 2017
| Party | Candidate | Votes | % | ±% |
|---|---|---|---|---|
| Labour | Julie AVIET | 672 | | |
| Labour | Margaret WILKINSON | 626 | | |
| Conservative | Mandy CADDY | 298 | | |
| Conservative | Russell Spencer DOWNE | 247 | | |
| Plaid Cymru | Oriel Anita JONES | 179 | | |
| Plaid Cymru | Alexander MUIRHEAD | 154 | | |

=== Illtyd (three seats) ===
Illtyd 2017
| Party | Candidate | Votes | % | ±% |
|---|---|---|---|---|
| Conservative | Tony HAMPTON | 1,359 | | |
| Conservative | Janice CHARLES | 1,352 | | |
| Conservative | Marguerita WRIGHT | 1,262 | | |
| Labour | John HARTLAND | 924 | | |
| Labour | Howard HAMILTON | 917 | | |
| Labour | Camilla BEAVEN | 826 | | |
| Plaid Cymru | Taif BALL | 447 | | |
| Plaid Cymru | Timothy John PEARCE | 350 | | |
| Plaid Cymru | Timothy Patrick JOHNSON | 342 | | |

=== Llandough (one seat) ===
Llandough 2017
| Party | Candidate | Votes | % | ±% |
|---|---|---|---|---|
| Conservative | George Dennis David CARROLL | 538 | | |
| Labour | Elliot PENN | 325 | | |
| Green | Liz ROSSER | 31 | | |

=== Llandow/Ewenny (one seat) ===
Llandow / Ewenny 2017
| Party | Candidate | Votes | % | ±% |
|---|---|---|---|---|
| Conservative | Christine Ann CAVE | 869 | 76.0 | |
| Labour | Huw James POWELL | 275 | 24.0 | |
| Majority | | 594 | 51.9 | |
| Turnout | | 1,144 | | |

=== Llantwit Major (four seats) ===
Llantwit Major 2017
| Party | Candidate | Votes | % | ±% |
|---|---|---|---|---|
| Llantwit First Independent | Gwyn John * | 2209 | | |
| Llantwit First Independent | Sally Margaret Hanks | 1984 | | |
| Llantwit First Independent | Eddie Williams * | 1588 | | |
| Llantwit First Independent | Jayne Margaret Norman | 1527 | | |
| Conservative | Tony Bennett * | 1360 | | |
| Conservative | John Colin Deakin | 1154 | | |
| Conservative | Bob Gant | 999 | | |
| Conservative | Gordon Wilkie | 908 | | |
| Labour | James Cullinane | 670 | | |
| Independent | Ceri Malessa-Thompson | 254 | | |
| UKIP | Melanie J. Hunter-Clarke | 112 | | |
| UKIP | Robin Hunter-Clarke | 112 | | |
| UKIP | Anthony Frederick Raybould | 78 | | |

=== Peterston-super-Ely (one seat) ===
Peterston-super-Ely 2017
| Party | Candidate | Votes | % | ±% |
|---|---|---|---|---|
| Conservative | Morgan, Michael John Griffith | 734 | 77.7 | |
| Labour | Cubbage, Eleri | 206 | 21.8 | |

=== Plymouth (two seats) ===
Plymouth 2017
| Party | Candidate | Votes | % | ±% |
|---|---|---|---|---|
| Conservative | Ben Gray | 894 | | |
| Conservative | Kathryn Frances McCaffer | 796 | | |
| Labour | Angela Thomas | 643 | | |
| Independent | Anthony Ernest | 505 | | |
| Independent | Clive Williams * | 443 | | |
| Independent | Victoria Humphries | 302 | | |
| Green | Tony Cooke | 288 | | |
| Plaid Cymru | Gareth Clubb | 240 | | |
| Liberal Democrats | Roger Pinkham | 169 | | |

=== Rhoose (two seats) ===
Rhoose 2017
| Party | Candidate | Votes | % | ±% |
|---|---|---|---|---|
| Conservative | Matthew LLOYD | 1,097 | | |
| Conservative | Gordon KEMP | 1,067 | | |
| Independent | Adam Peter RILEY | 809 | | |
| Labour | Graham Matthew LOVELUCK-EDWARDS | 587 | | |
| Independent | Samantha Angela CAMPBELL | 565 | | |
| Liberal Democrats | Daniel David PARROTT | 187 | | |

=== St Athan (one seat) ===
St Athan 2017
| Party | Candidate | Votes | % | ±% |
|---|---|---|---|---|
| Conservative | John Thomas | 566 | 56.9% | −1.4% |
| Labour | Julie Lynch-Wilson | 349 | 35.1% | −6.6% |
| Pirate | David A Elston | 75 | 7.6% | New |
| Majority | | | | |
| Turnout | | 993 | 38.43% | |
| Conservative hold | | Swing | | |

=== St Augustine's (two seats) ===
St Augustine's 2017
| Party | Candidate | Votes | % | ±% |
|---|---|---|---|---|
| Labour | Ruba Sivagnanam | 967 | | |
| Labour | Neil Christopher Thomas | 827 | | |
| Conservative | Martin James Turner | 737 | | |
| Conservative | Wendy van den Brom | 633 | | |
| Green | Anthony Slaughter | 436 | | |
| Independent | Paul Church | 312 | | |
| Plaid Cymru | Anne Greagsby | 288 | | |
| Plaid Cymru | Aled Thomas | 217 | | |
| Independent | Graham Humphries | 186 | | |
| Green | Gareth Snaith | 157 | | |
| Liberal Democrats | Robin Lynn | 138 | | |
| Liberal Democrats | Heath John Marshall | 121 | | |

=== St Brides Major (one seat) ===
St Bride's Major 2017
| Party | Candidate | Votes | % | ±% |
|---|---|---|---|---|
| Conservative | Stewart Thomas EDWARDS | 865 | | |
| Labour | Andrew HENNESSY | 287 | | |

=== Stanwell (two seats) ===
Stanwell 2017
| Party | Candidate | Votes | % | ±% |
|---|---|---|---|---|
| Labour | Lis BURNETT | 704 | | |
| Labour | Mark Robert WILSON | 631 | | |
| Conservative | Natalie WILLIAMS | 402 | | |
| Conservative | Ben DRISCOLL | 388 | | |
| Independent | Anthony John HARRIS | 198 | | |
| Green | Paul BESWICK | 178 | | |
| Plaid Cymru | Sandy CLUBB | 139 | | |

=== Sully (two seats) ===
Sully 2017
| Party | Candidate | Votes | % | ±% |
|---|---|---|---|---|
| Independent | Bob PENROSE * | 904 | | |
| Independent | Kevin Phillip MAHONEY * | 782 | | |
| Conservative | Rod THOMAS | 763 | | |
| Conservative | Chris THORNE | 726 | | |
| Labour | Laura ROCHEFORT | 293 | | |
| Plaid Cymru | John RIMINGTOM | 137 | | |
| Independent hold | | Swing | | |
| Independent gain from UKIP | | Swing | | |

=== Wenvoe (one seat) ===
Wenvoe 2017
| Party | Candidate | Votes | % | ±% |
|---|---|---|---|---|
| Conservative | Jonathan Charles BIRD | 753 | | |
| Labour | Sian Frances BROOKS | 195 | | |
| Plaid Cymru | Ian Anthony Neil PERRY | 190 | | |
| Independent | Russell Edward GODFREY | 165 | | |
