= Llantwit Major School =

School in the Vale of Glamorgan, Wales

Coordinates: 51.405°N 3.476°W

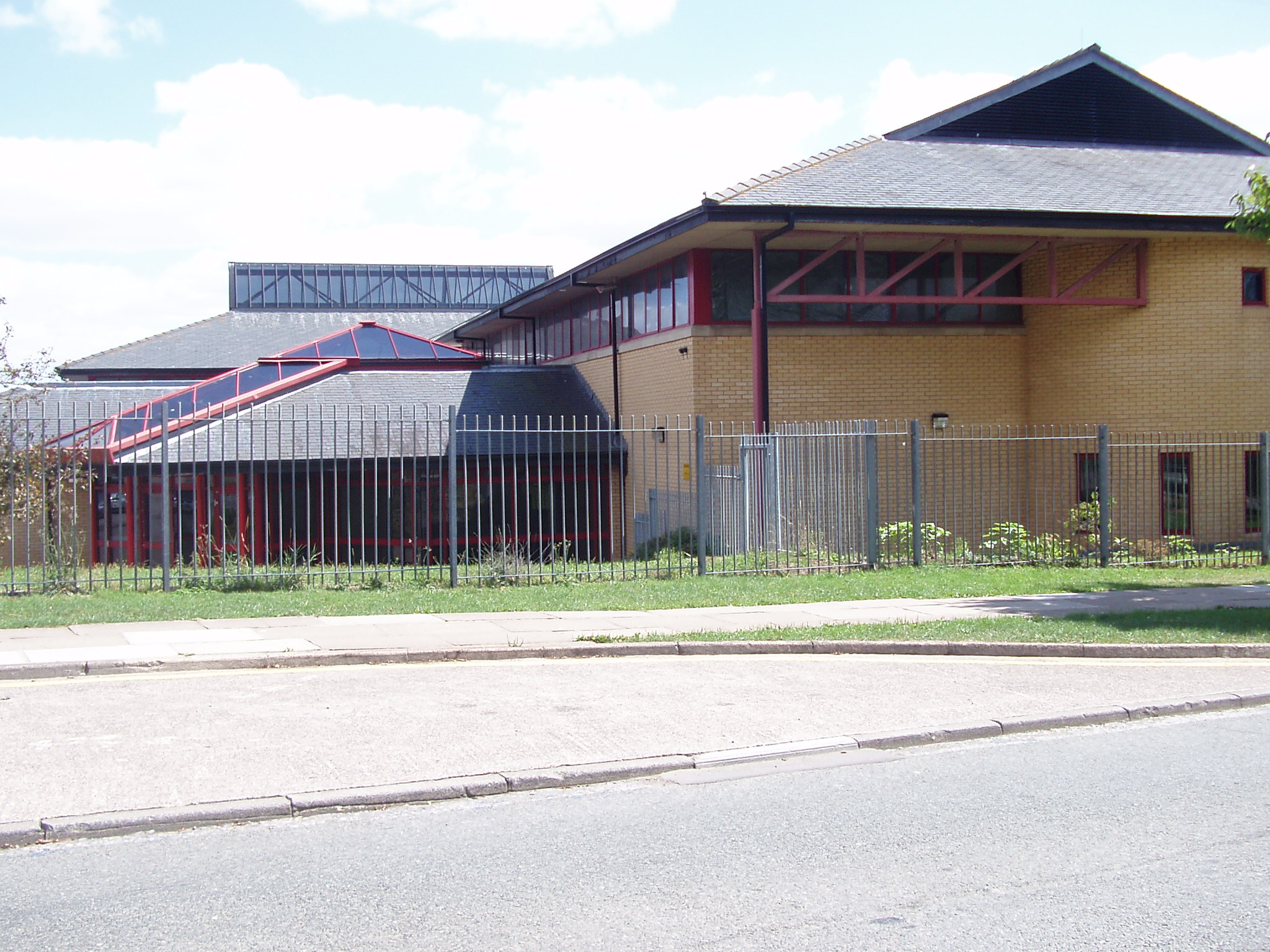
Llantwit Major Comprehensive

Llantwit Major School is a school in the town of Llantwit Major in the Vale of Glamorgan, on the coast of south Wales. The school consists of a separate primary and secondary school which are located on the same site.

== History ==
=== 1991 arson attack ===
At Llanilltud Fawr School, a fire was started on 9 October 1991 at 4am. 60 firemen attended with 12 engines for three hours. It contaminated the local water. A third of the school was destroyed in 20 minutes. There were 916 at the school, with headmaster Jack Davies. The school hall and school records were destroyed.

A large section of the comprehensive was burned to the ground in 1991 and rebuilt a year later. A further rebuild was scheduled to begin 2011/2012 but was scrapped due to lack of funding. A new building broke ground in September 2015 and was completed at the end of February 2017. Demolition of the old blocks has since been completed. It shares its site with primary school Ysgol y Ddraig.

== Curriculum ==
The school's departmental success in both sport and drama is renowned over much of the Vale, having won awards and acclaim for both.

The current headteacher is Charlotte Robins.

The school was temporarily closed due to the COVID-19 pandemic in the United Kingdom on 20 March 2020, re-opening on 4 September 2020.

== Notable alumni ==
- Stephen Doughty (born 1980), Welsh Labour Co-op Member of Parliament for Cardiff South and Penarth
