= Llandow (electoral ward) =

Coordinates: 51.4685°N 3.5260°W

- Electoral ward
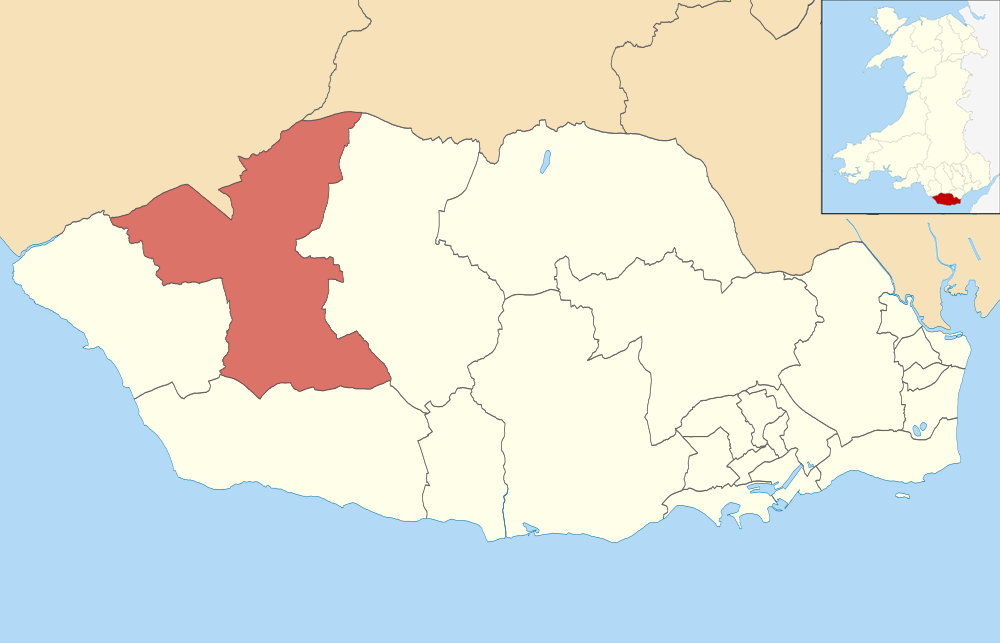
- Location of the former Llandow/Ewenny within the Vale of Glamorgan
- Population: 2,643 (Llandow/Ewenny, 2011 census)
- Community: Colwinston, Llandow, Llangan
- Principal area: Vale of Glamorgan
- Country: Wales
- Sovereign state: United Kingdom
- UK Parliament: Vale of Glamorgan
- Senedd Cymru – Welsh Parliament: Vale of Glamorgan
- Councillors: 1 (County)

Llandow (between 1995 and 2022 known as Llandow/Ewenny or Llandow and Ewenny) is an electoral ward in the west of the Vale of Glamorgan, Wales. It covers its namesake community of Llandow as well as the neighbouring communities of Colwinston and Llangan. Since 1995 the ward has elected a county councillor to the Vale of Glamorgan Council.

According to the 2011 census the population of the Llandow/Ewenny ward was 2,643.

The ward of St Brides Major lies to the west, Cowbridge to the east and Llantwit Major to the south. To the north is Bridgend County Borough.

From the 2022 Vale of Glamorgan Council elections, the community of Ewenny was moved into the St Brides Major ward and the ward became known simply as Llandow.

== County elections ==
The ward elects one councillor to the Vale of Glamorgan Council. It is currently represented by the Welsh Conservative Party.

2017 Vale of Glamorgan Council election
Party	Candidate	Votes	%	±%
Conservative	Christine Ann CAVE	869		
Labour	Huw James POWELL	275		

At the previous election in May 2012, Ray Thomas was elected for the Conservatives, with a majority of 358 votes over the Labour candidate.

A by-election took place on 5 March 2009 following the death in January of Conservative councillor, Colin Vaughan. Vaughan had been the ward's councillor for more than 10 years. The ward was retained by the Conservatives.

2008 Vale of Glamorgan Council election
Party	Candidate	Votes	%	±%
Conservative	Colin VAUGHAN	717	65.8%	
Plaid Cymru	Wynford BELLIN	210	19.3%	
Labour	Claire CURTIS	162	14.9%	

The ward has elected a Conservative councillor since the creation of the Vale of Glamorgan unitary authority in 1995. Prior to 1996 Ewenny was part of the Borough of Ogwr, with the Vale ward being known simply as Llandow.

1995 Vale of Glamorgan Council election
Party	Candidate	Votes	%	±%
Conservative	R. Thomas	532		
Labour	(Ms) C. Price	505		
Liberal Democrats	(Ms) S. Wilson	93		
Independent	(Ms) J. Horton	87		
Plaid Cymru	J. Bellin	80		

Councillor Thomas was councillor for the previous Llandow ward.
