= Michaelston-le-Pit and Leckwith =

Community in Vale of Glamorgan, Wales

Coordinates: 51.459°N 3.226°W

- Community
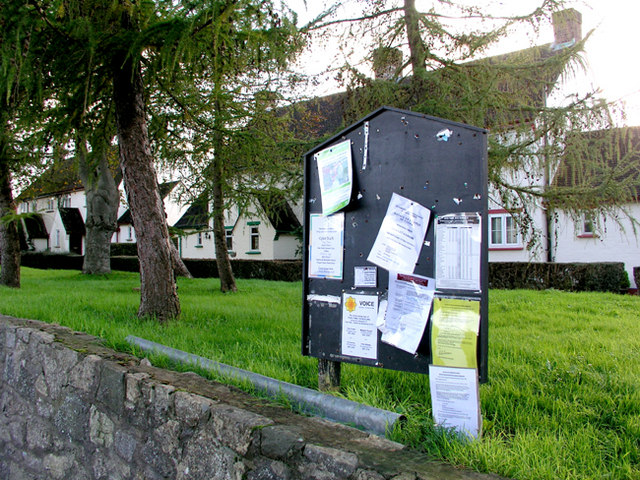
- Michaelston-le-Pit village green and noticeboard
- Principal area: Vale of Glamorgan
- Country: Wales
- Sovereign state: United Kingdom
- Police: South Wales
- Fire: South Wales
- Ambulance: Welsh
- List of places UK Wales Vale of Glamorgan Map of the community

Michaelston-le-Pit and Leckwith is a community in the Vale of Glamorgan, Wales. It is located immediately southwest of the city of Cardiff (bounded by the A4232 road) and to the north of the Vale of Glamorgan villages of Llandough and Dinas Powys. As its name suggests, the community includes the small villages of Michaelston-le-Pit and Leckwith. The community population comprises only just under 250 adults.

Michaelston-le-Pit and Leckwith have a community council comprising seven councillors and a clerk. For Vale of Glamorgan Council elections the community is part of the Dinas Powys ward.

Buildings of note in Michaelston-le-Pit and Leckwith include the Grade I listed St Michael's Church in Michaelston-le-Pit and the Old Leckwith Bridge (crossing the River Ely to Cardiff) which has a Grade II* heritage listing.

The population in 2011 was 309.
