= Stephen Doughty =

Welsh politician (born 1980)

Stephen Doughty MP
- Official portrait, 2025

Minister of State for the Middle East, North Africa, Afghanistan and Pakistan
- Incumbent
- Assumed office 20 July 2026
- Prime Minister: Andy Burnham
- Preceded by: Hamish Falconer

Minister of State for Europe, North America and Overseas Territories
- In office 8 July 2024 – 20 July 2026
- Prime Minister: Keir Starmer
- Preceded by: Nus Ghani (Note: Europe); David Rutley (Note: Americas and Overseas Territories)
- Succeeded by: The Lord Wood of Anfield (Note: Europe); Uma Kumaran (Note: Overseas Territories); Chris Elmore (Note: North America)
Shadow portfolios
Shadow Minister for Foreign, Commonwealth and Development Affairs (Note: 2015-2016 Africa, South Asia and International Organisations 2020-2021 Africa and International Development 2021-2024 Europe, North America and the Overseas Territories)
In office 9 April 2020 – 5 July 2024
Leader	Keir Starmer
Preceded by	Afzal Khan
Succeeded by	Alicia Kearns
In office 28 October 2015 – 6 January 2016
Leader	Jeremy Corbyn
Preceded by	David Hanson
Succeeded by	Fabian Hamilton
Shadow Minister for Trade and Industry
In office 22 June 2015 – 28 October 2015
Leader	Harriet Harman; Jeremy Corbyn
Preceded by	Ian Murray (Note: (Trade and Investment))
Succeeded by	Kevin Brennan (Note: (Trade, Investment and Intellectual Property))

Member of Parliament for Cardiff South and Penarth
- Incumbent
- Assumed office 15 November 2012
- Preceded by: Alun Michael
- Majority: 11,767 (30.0%)

Personal details
- Born: Stephen John Doughty; 15 April 1980 (age 46) Cardiff, Wales
- Party: Labour Co-op
- Education: Corpus Christi College, Oxford; University of St Andrews
- Website: stephendoughty.wales

Stephen John Doughty (born 15 April 1980) is a Welsh Labour Co-op politician who has served as Member of Parliament (MP) for Cardiff South and Penarth since 2012. He served since July 2026 as Minister of State for the Middle East, North Africa, Afghanistan and Pakistan. He has previously served as Minister of State for Europe, North America and Overseas Territories from July 2024 to July 2026.

== Early life and education ==
Stephen Doughty was born on 15 April 1980 in Cardiff, Wales, with his family moving to the Vale of Glamorgan when he was young. After attending Llantwit Major Comprehensive School, he was awarded a scholarship to study at Lester B. Pearson United World College of the Pacific in Canada. While a student at UWC Pearson, he served as a member of British Columbia Youth Parliament.

He went to university at Corpus Christi College, University of Oxford, from which he graduated with an upper second-class degree in Philosophy, Politics and Economics. Whilst at Oxford, Doughty was a member of an all-male lower-voice a cappella group, Out of the Blue. He completed further studies at the University of St Andrews in Scotland, where he studied for his master's degree.

== Career ==
After time spent working in Denmark, Doughty returned to the UK, where he became an adviser to Labour MP Douglas Alexander. He then worked in various roles for Oxfam International, before becoming the head of Oxfam Cymru in 2011.

From 2004 to 2009, Doughty was a trustee of the British section of United World Colleges.

Doughty and his father had been long-time family friends of Cardiff South and Penarth Labour MP Alun Michael. Michael said, "Stephen Doughty’s father and I first met 40 years ago when I was a youth worker and he was involved with an Army youth group. I have known Stephen since he was a baby." After Michael's intervention Doughty's name was included in the final short list along with four other candidates, Kate Groucutt, Karen Wilkie, Nick Thomas-Symonds and Jeremy Miles. Doughty was selected in a vote by constituency Labour Party members on 14 July 2012.

== Parliamentary career ==
At the 2012 Cardiff South and Penarth by-election, Doughty was elected to Parliament as MP for Cardiff South and Penarth with 47.3% of the vote and a majority of 5,334. Doughty made his maiden speech in the House of Commons on 28 November 2012.

In January 2013, Doughty was appointed to the Labour Shadow Treasury team as an aide to Rachel Reeves, the Shadow Chief Secretary to the Treasury.

=== 2015 Parliament ===
Doughty was re-elected as MP for Cardiff South and Penarth at the 2015 general election with a decreased vote share of 42.8% and an increased majority of 7,453.

Following Iain Wright's election as the Business, Innovation and Skills (BIS) Select Committee chair, Doughty succeed him in the Shadow BIS team as the Shadow Minister for Trade and Industry in a June 2015 mini-reshuffle.

In October 2015, he was moved to a position as a Shadow Foreign Office Minister with responsibility for Africa, South Asia and International Organisations, under Shadow Foreign Secretary Hilary Benn.

In December 2015 Doughty supported air strikes against Syria, a decision for which he was criticised by many of his constituents and political activists via social media. He called the police to deal with the "personal threats" he had received.

He supported Owen Smith in the failed attempt to replace Jeremy Corbyn in the 2016 Labour Party leadership election.

=== Resignation from frontbench ===
In January 2016, Doughty announced that he had resigned as a shadow Foreign Minister on the live Daily Politics programme, saying that he supported the sacked Pat McFadden's views on terrorism and accusing members of the Labour leadership team of lying about the reasons for McFadden's sacking. According to McFadden, he was sacked for comments in the debate on the Paris bombings which condemned "the view that sees terrorist acts as always being a response or a reaction to what we in the west do".

Doughty's appearance on Daily Politics became contentious after it emerged that Laura Kuenssberg, the BBC's political editor, had arranged for Doughty to make his public announcement on the programme just before Prime Minister's Questions. According to Labour's spokesman, it was an "unacceptable breach of the BBC's role and statutory obligations. By the BBC's own account, BBC journalists and presenters proposed and secured the resignation of a shadow minister on air ... apparently to ensure maximum news and political impact." The Labour Party's Director of Communications, Seumas Milne, made a formal complaint to the BBC. The BBC's head of live political programmes, Robbie Gibb, wrote to Milne: "Neither the programme production team, nor Laura, played any part in his decision to resign. As you know it is a long standing tradition that political programmes on the BBC, along with all other news outlets, seek to break stories. It is true that we seek to make maximum impact with our journalism which is entirely consistent with the BBC's editorial guidelines and values." Doughty said on Twitter that he had resigned "shortly before I did the interview so there was not time for spin doctors to start smearing me".

=== 2017 Parliament ===
At the snap 2017 general election, Doughty was again re-elected, with an increased vote share of 59.5% and an increased majority of 14,864.

=== 2019 Parliament ===
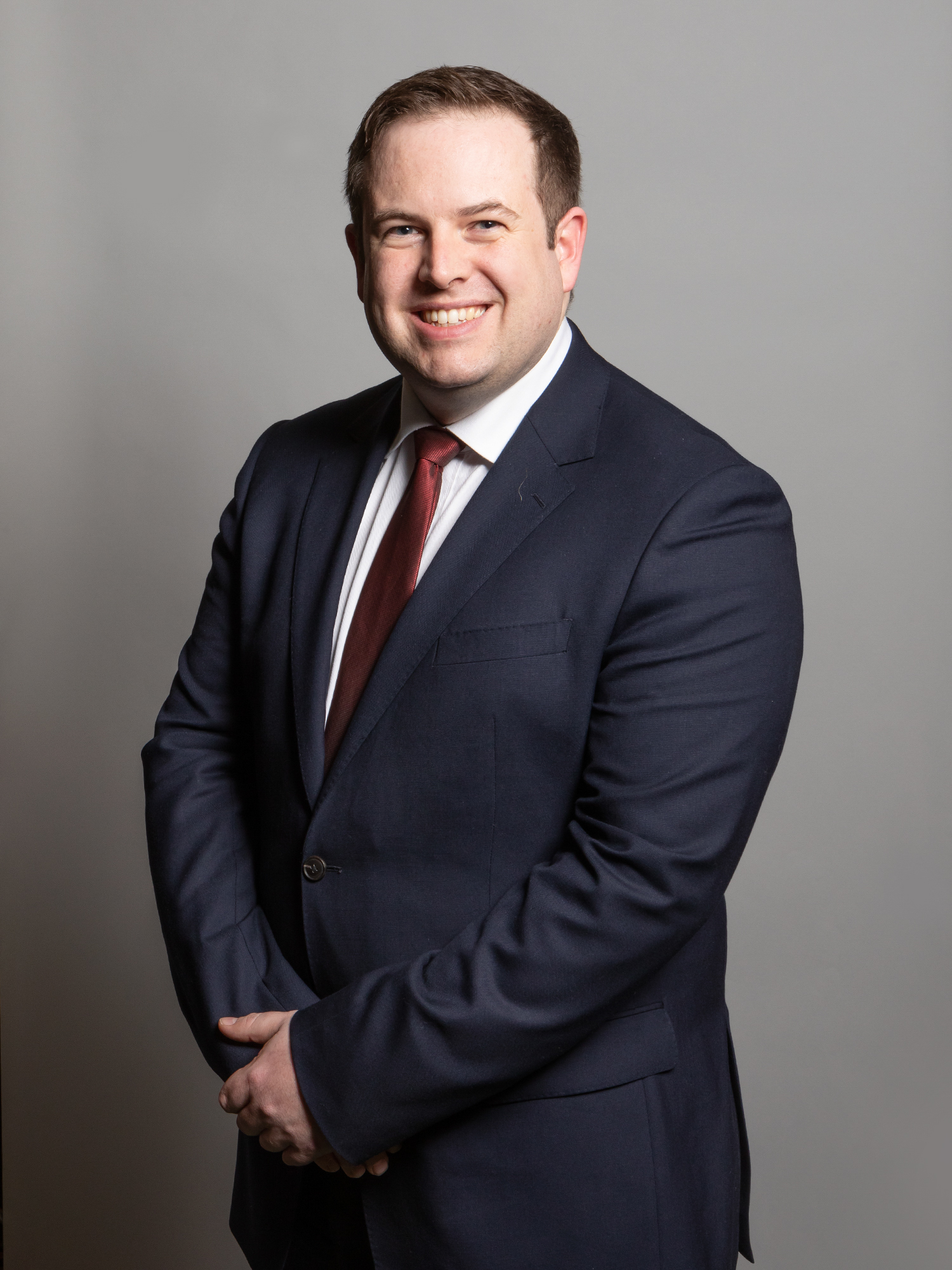
Official portrait, 2020

He was again re-elected at the 2019 general election, with a decreased vote share of 54.1% and a decreased majority of 12,737.

Doughty endorsed Keir Starmer in his successful campaign in the 2020 Labour Party leadership election.

Starmer appointed Doughty Shadow Minister for the Foreign and Commonwealth Office and Department for International Development, responsible for Africa and international development.

In May 2021, Doughty apologised for asking a constituent to provide him with diazepam, a Class C-controlled drug, without a prescription for anxiety ahead of a flight in 2019. South Wales Police did not take further action because they determined that the allegation he possessed a controlled substance "cannot be proved in these circumstances". The Parliamentary Commissioner for Standards ruled in October 2021 that he had not broken the MPs' code of conduct. The constituent who was cautioned for supplying the diazepam complained to the Independent Office for Police Conduct, who asked South Wales Police to re-examine the case in May 2022. They announced in December 2022 that they stood by their original decision.

=== Labour in government ===
Doughty was again re-elected at the 2024 general election with a decreased vote share of 44.5% and a decreased majority of 11,767. Shortly afterwards, he was appointed Minister of State for Europe, North America and Overseas Territories in the Foreign, Commonwealth and Development Office.

In a debate in the House of Commons in March 2024, Doughty recognized the expulsion of Armenians from Nagorno-Karabakh as ethnic cleansing, raised the issue of protecting Armenia's cultural heritage, and strongly urged the House to provide more assistance to the Armenian refugees.

As Foreign Office Minister Stephen has criticised the government of Georgia over its crackdown on free speech and LGBT rights, saying that it is 'clear that the direction of the Georgian Dream party risks undermining freedom of expression and assembly and further discriminating against and stigmatising Georgia's LGBT+ community, including through the introduction of the Law on Family Values, and that he has raised 'concerns over recent legislative changes' with Georgian Foreign Minister Ilia Darchiashvili.

Doughty condemned the mass killings and atrocities committed by the Rapid Support Forces (RSF) during their capture of El Fasher, Sudan, in late October 2025. He described the reports of civilian executions and torture as "horrifying and deeply alarming".

In July 2026, he was reappointed to the new government as Minister of State at the Foreign, Commonwealth and Development Office by Andy Burnham.

== Personal life ==
Doughty lives in the Splott area of Cardiff. He has been a Cub and Scout leader since 2004, and is a Cardiff City season ticket holder. He has featured in the Pinc List of leading Welsh LGBTQ+ figures every year from 2017 to 2024. He is a Christian. He came out as gay to family and friends in his late 20s.

== Notes ==
Parliament of the United Kingdom
Preceded by Alun Michael	Member of Parliament for Cardiff South and Penarth; 2012–present	Incumbent
