= 2012 Cardiff South and Penarth by-election =

2012 UK Parliamentary by-election

- 15 November 2012

The Cardiff South and Penarth Parliamentary seat in the House of Commons
- Turnout: 25.7%
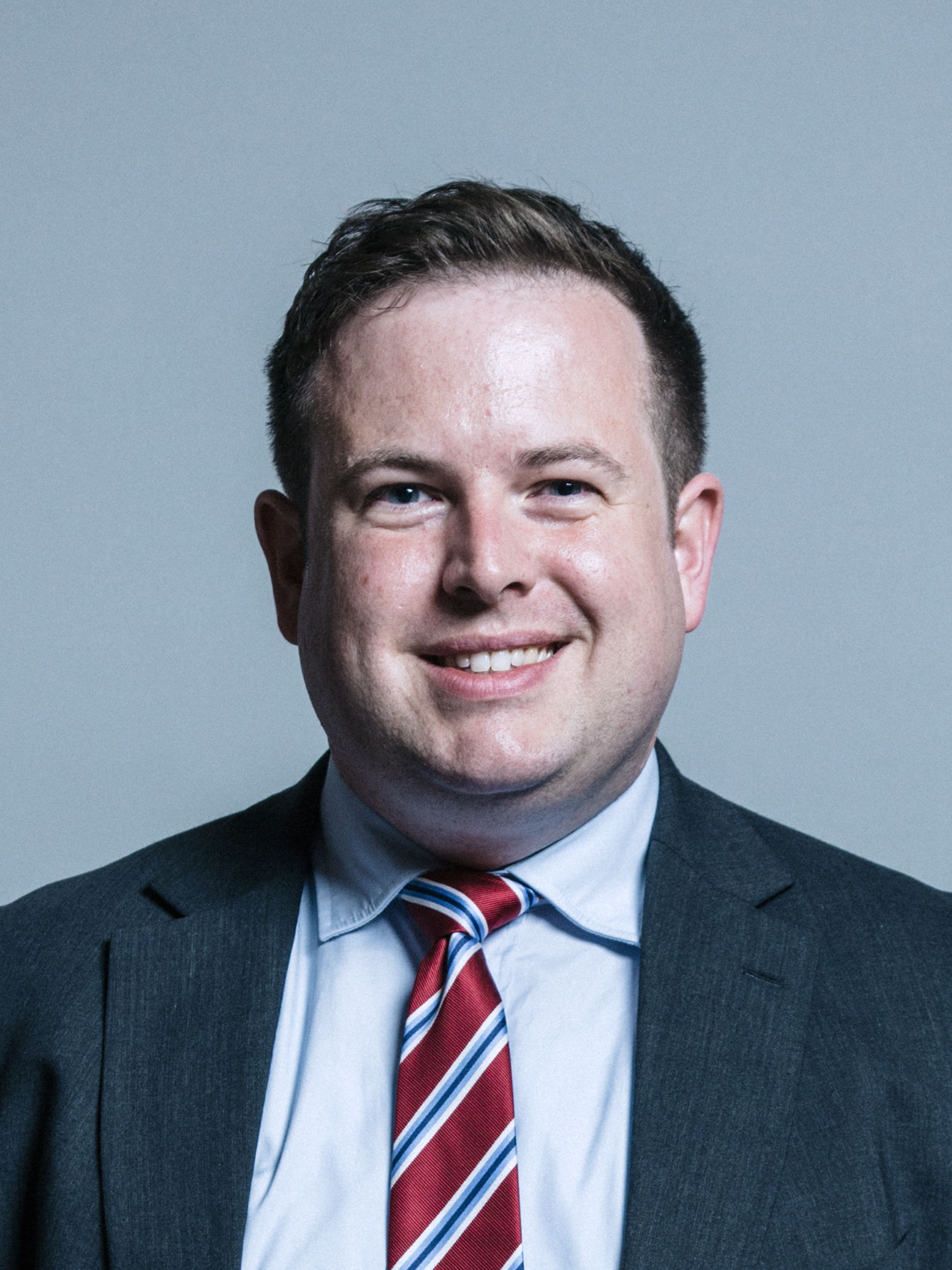

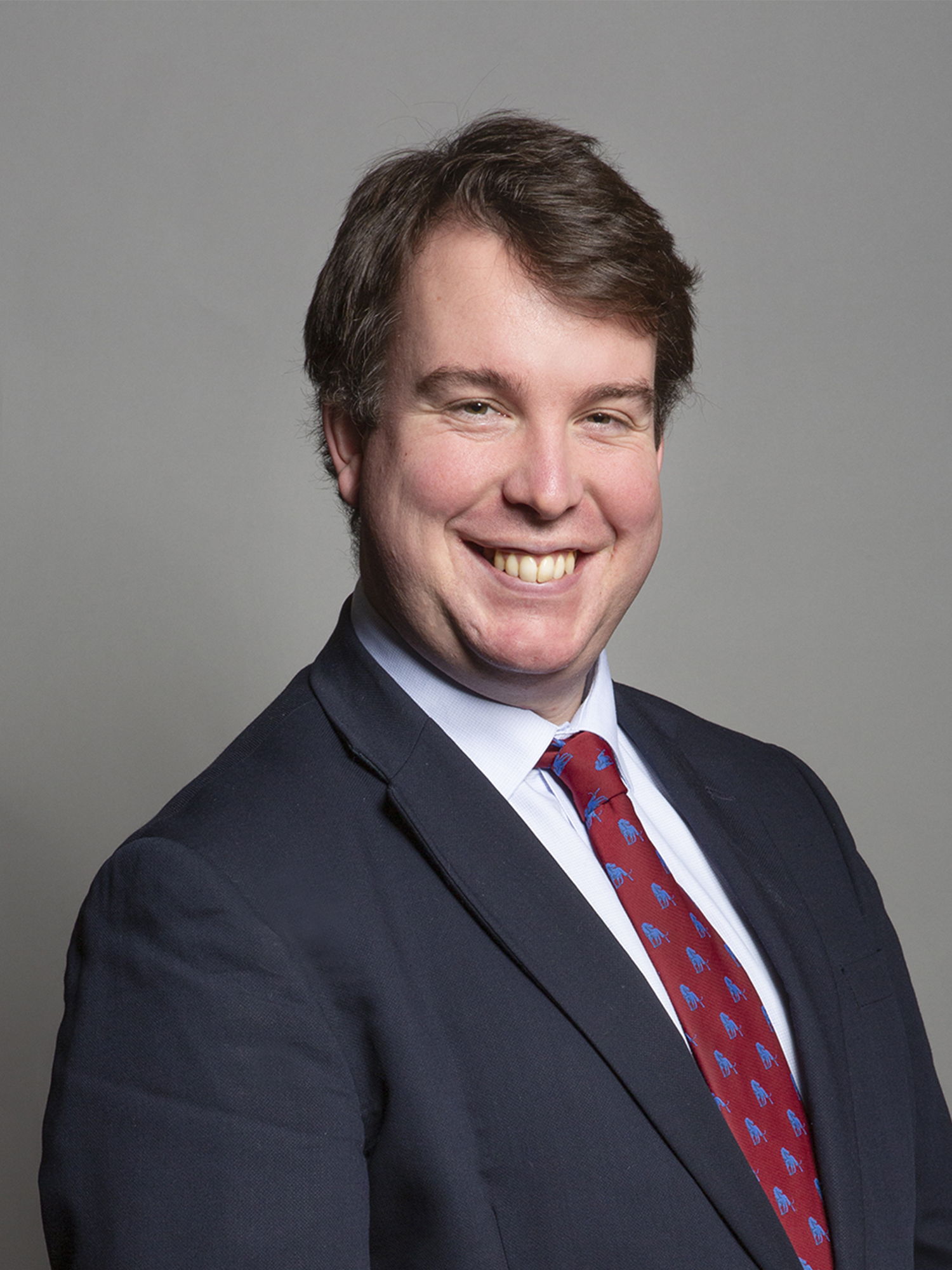
	First party	Second party	Third party
Candidate	Stephen Doughty	Craig Williams	Bablin Molik
Party	Labour	Conservative	Liberal Democrats
Popular vote	9,193	3,859	2,103
Percentage	47.3%	19.9%	10.8%
Swing	▲8.4 pp	▼8.4 pp	▼11.5 pp
	Fourth party	Fifth party
Candidate	Luke Nicholas	Simon Zeigler
Party	Plaid Cymru	UKIP
Popular vote	1,854	1,179
Percentage	9.5%	6.1%
Swing	▲5.3 pp	▲3.5 pp
MP before election
Alun Michael
Labour
Subsequent MP
Stephen Doughty
Labour

A by-election for the United Kingdom parliamentary constituency of Cardiff South and Penarth was held on 15 November 2012, triggered by the resignation of the incumbent Labour Party MP Alun Michael. Stephen Doughty of Labour held the seat for the party with an increased majority

The by-election was held on the same day as the Manchester Central and Corby by-elections, and the inaugural Police and Crime Commissioner elections.

== Background ==
The seat has been held by Labour since its creation in 1983. Full background details of the constituency are on Cardiff South and Penarth (UK Parliament constituency)

This was the first by-election to be held in Cardiff since the Cardiff East by-election of 1942.

Michael resigned after being selected as the Labour Party candidate in the Police and Crime Commissioner Elections for South Wales Police the election for which was also held on 15 November 2012. Michael successfully won the PCC election. PCC election candidates did not have to resign their seats in Parliament upon becoming a nominee. However, in the event of their victory in the election they would have been obliged to do so. Knowing that his likelihood of victory in a traditionally pro-Labour region was high, Michael chose to resign early in order for the Westminster by-election to be able to be held at the same time as the PCC election rather than forcing voters to go to the polls again a few weeks later. The decision to resign upon nomination rather than victory was similarly made by Tony Lloyd, who had been nominated as a PCC candidate for the Greater Manchester Police area and resulted in the 2012 Manchester Central by-election being held on the same day.

On 22 October 2012, Alun Michael was appointed Steward and Bailiff of the Three Hundreds of Chiltern, the manner in which resignations from the House of Commons are permitted.

The writ for the by-election in Cardiff South and Penarth was moved on 23 October 2012 and the deadline for nominations was 4 pm on 31 October 2012.

== Candidates ==
Cardiff City Council released the Statement of Persons Nominated on 1 November 2012.

The Labour and Co-operative Party selected the head of Oxfam Cymru Stephen Doughty as its candidate in July 2012 in controversial circumstances. Although initially excluded from the shortlist, Doughty was actively endorsed by the then incumbent Labour MP Alun Michael (a long-time family friend) who insisted on his inclusion and advocated his selection. Some Labour activists considered Michael's involvement was improper saying "It’s no business at all of an outgoing MP to interfere in the selection of a candidate to succeed him in such a way". The ballot paper description for Stephen Doughty was "Welsh Labour".

Cardiff City councillor Craig Williams was confirmed as the Conservative candidate on 13 September. Cllr Williams represents Cardiff on the Local Government Association.

Bablin Molik was chosen by the Liberal Democrats as their candidate. Molik is a medical researcher with a PhD.

Luke Nicholas was chosen by Plaid Cymru. The party described him as a trade unionist employed as a researcher at the National Assembly who specialises in finance, transport and local government.

Andrew Jordan, 24, the president of the Socialist Labour Party (UK) and a former resident of Cardiff South and Penarth, represented the party. Jordan previously headed the SLP list of candidates for South Wales Central in the 2011 Welsh Assembly Elections.

The general secretary of the Communist Party of Britain (CPB), Robert Griffiths, who stood in the 2010 general election, was the candidate of the Welsh Communist Party, the local part of the CPB.

The Green Party candidate was Anthony Slaughter, chair of the local environmental group Gwyrddio Penarth Greening. Slaughter is a garden designer who has worked in Penarth since 2004.

Simon Zeigler became the UK Independence Party candidate. He was a parole office worker who stood for them in the 2010 general election.

Cardiff South and Penarth was viewed as one of the safest Labour seats in Britain but ever since 1997 Alun Michael had seen his majority being progressively eroded. However, in the by-election held on 15 November 2012, Labour's decline was reversed - although on a basis of very low turn-out (down 38.2% on the 2010 general election). Labour's Stephen Doughty succeeded Alun Michael with 9,193 votes, comprising 47.3% of the overall vote. This was an increase of 8.4% on Michael's 2010 performance. Doughty thus became the third MP in the constituency's history.

In this by-election, Conservatives saw their support slide by the identical percentage by which Labour's rose (8.4%) and achieved only 19.9% of the vote (3,859 votes). The Liberal Democrats' support declined by even more than that of their UK Coalition partners (down 11.5%). Plaid Cymru's share of the vote rose to 9.5% (1,854 votes, up 5.4%); however these percentages may mask reality because Plaid Cymru only gained a mere 3 votes more than the total they polled in 2010. Also performing well in percentage terms was UKIP with their support rising by 3.1% (to 6.1% of the total). Greens also increased their share of the vote to 4.1% (a rise of 2.9%). The veteran Communist campaigner Robert Griffiths saw his support rise slightly to a 1.1% share of the vote.

== By-election result ==
2012 Cardiff South and Penarth by-election
Party	Candidate	Votes	%	±%
Labour Co-op	Stephen Doughty	9,193	47.3	+8.4
Conservative	Craig Williams	3,859	19.9	–8.4
Liberal Democrats	Bablin Molik	2,103	10.8	–11.5
Plaid Cymru	Luke Nicholas	1,854	9.5	+5.3
UKIP	Simon Zeigler	1,179	6.1	+3.5
Green	Anthony Slaughter	800	4.1	+2.9
Socialist Labour	Andrew Jordan	235	1.2	N/A
Communist	Robert Griffiths	213	1.1	+0.7
Rejected ballots		135		
Majority		5,334	27.4	+16.8
Turnout		19,436	25.7	–34.8
Registered electors		76,764		
Labour Co-op hold		Swing	+8.4	

Of the 135 rejected ballots:

- 63 were either unmarked or it was uncertain who the vote was for.
- 69 voted for more than one candidate.
- 3 had writing or a mark by which the voter could be identified.

== Previous result ==
General election 2010: Cardiff South and Penarth
Party	Candidate	Votes	%	±%
Labour Co-op	Alun Michael	17,262	38.9	–7.7
Conservative	Simon Hoare	12,553	28.3	+4.4
Liberal Democrats	Dominic Hannigan	9,875	22.3	+2.4
Plaid Cymru	Farida Aslam	1,851	4.2	–1.1
UKIP	Simon Zeigler	1,145	2.6	+1.2
Independent	George Burke	648	1.5	N/A
Green	Matthew Townsend	554	1.2	–0.6
Christian	Clive Bate	285	0.6	N/A
Communist	Robert Griffiths	196	0.4	N/A
Majority		4,709	10.6	–14.4
Turnout		44,369	60.2	+2.0
Registered electors		73,707		
Labour Co-op hold		Swing	–6.0	

== See also ==
- List of United Kingdom by-elections
- Opinion polling for the 2015 United Kingdom general election
