= Peterston-super-Ely (electoral ward) =

- Electoral ward
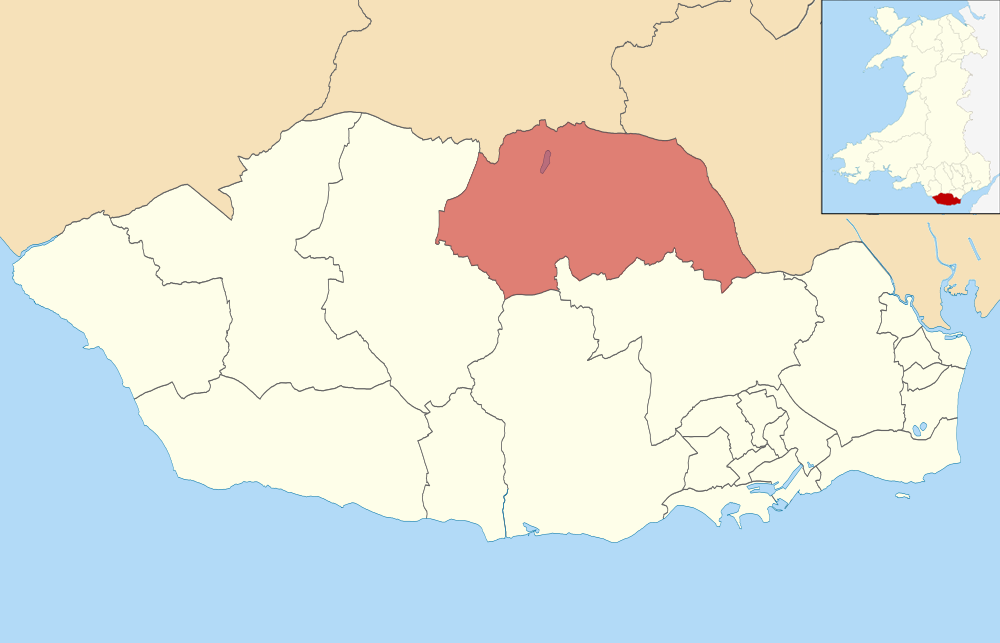
- Location of the (pre-2022) Peterston-super-Ely ward in the Vale of Glamorgan
- Population: 2,289 (2011 census)
- Community: Pendoylan, Peterston-super-Ely, St Georges super Ely and Welsh St Donats
- Principal area: Vale of Glamorgan
- Country: Wales
- Sovereign state: United Kingdom
- UK Parliament: Vale of Glamorgan
- Senedd Cymru – Welsh Parliament: Vale of Glamorgan
- Councillors: 1 (County)

Peterston-super-Ely is an electoral ward in the Vale of Glamorgan, Wales, which covers its namesake village of Peterston-super-Ely and the neighbouring communities of Pendoylan and Welsh St Donats. The ward elects a county councillor to the Vale of Glamorgan Council.

According to the 2011 census the population of the ward was 2,289.

In 2022 St Georges super Ely was transferred from Peterston-super-Ely to a new ward, as a result of recommendations from the Local Democracy and Boundary Commission for Wales.

== County councillors ==
The ward elects one councillor to the Vale of Glamorgan Council.

A. J. (Tony) Williams represented Peterson-super-Ely for the Conservative Party until 2007. He had been a local government councillor since before the 1974 local government reorganisation. He and his wife were found dead at their Cowbridge home in June 2017. The ward was then represented by Rhodri Traherne for the Conservatives.

2012 Vale of Glamorgan Council election
Party	Candidate	Votes	%	±%
Conservative	Traherne, Rhodri	653	74.2	
Labour	Gilhooly, Eileen	223	25.3	

2017 Vale of Glamorgan Council election
Party	Candidate	Votes	%	±%
Conservative	Morgan, Michael John Griffith	734	77.7	
Labour	Cubbage, Eleri	206	21.8	

In 2017 Michael Morgan was elected for the Conservatives. However, in May 2019 he moved to the Vale Independents Group along with several other Conservative councillors. In the 2022 election Morgan held the ward as an independent, although his share of the vote dropped by 19.0% on 2017.

2022 Vale of Glamorgan Council election
Party	Candidate	Votes	%	±%
Independent	Michael Morgan	486	59.1	+59.1
Conservative	Gary John Allman	178	21.7	−56.4
Labour	Eleri Cubbage	158	19.2	−2.7

== Cardiff Rural District Council ==
Prior to 1974, Peterson-super-Ely was a ward to Cardiff Rural District Council, electing one councillor. In 1970 it elected an independent councillor, W. J. Meredith.
