= 2022 Vale of Glamorgan Council election =

2022 Welsh local government election

- 5 May 2022

All 54 (previously 47) seats to Vale of Glamorgan Council 28 seats needed for a majority
	First party	Second party	Third party
Party	Labour	Conservative	Plaid Cymru
Last election	14	23	4
Seats before	14	15	4
Seats won	25	13	8
Seat change	▲11	▼10	▲4
	Fourth party	Fifth party
Party	Llantwit First Independent	Independent
Last election	4	2
Seats before	4	10
Seats won	4	4
Seat change	Steady	▲2
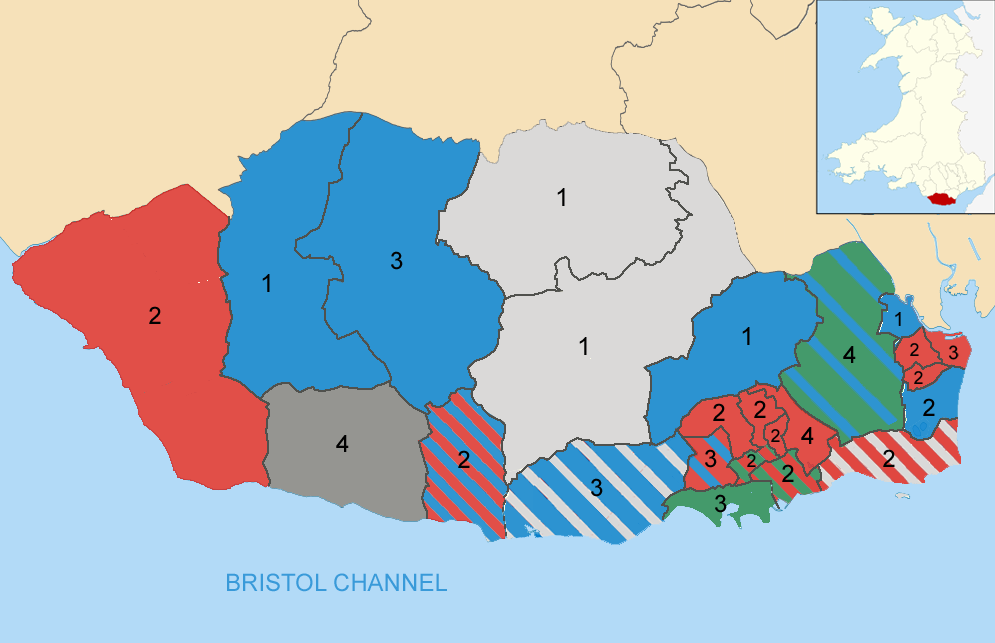
- Election results map, showing party colours of councillors and numbers of councillors per ward
Council control before election
No overall control
Council control after election
No overall control

The 2022 Vale of Glamorgan Council election took place on 5 May 2022 to elect 54 members across 24 wards to Vale of Glamorgan Council. On the same day, elections were held to the other 21 local authorities and to community councils in Wales as part of the 2022 Welsh local elections. The previous Vale of Glamorgan all-council election took place in May 2017 and future elections will take place every five years.

== Background ==
Council elections in Wales were originally scheduled for May 2021, but were delayed to avoid a conflict with the 2021 Senedd election. The frequency of the elections was also increased from four years to five years to avoid future clashes, meaning (after 2022) the next council election is expected in 2027. The number of councillors was increased from 47 to 54 at the 2022 election, with a number of ward changes to ensure better electoral parity.

The council has been in no overall control since the 2012 election. Following the 2017 Vale of Glamorgan Council election the Conservatives held 23 out of 47 seats on the Council and formed a minority administration led by John Thomas, who replaced Labour's Neil Moore. After the Conservative local councillor for Rhoose resigned over plans to shut Llancarfan's primary school, the February 2019 by-election returned former Welsh Conservatives leader Andrew R. T. Davies, who also opposed the closure. Davies and three other Conservative councillors then blocked the council's budget for the financial year. Anger over plans for parking also contributed to what a Local Democracy Reporting Service reporter called "serious discontent" between Thomas and other councillors in the party by April 2019.

As a result, local Conservative Party members voted at their 29 April annual meeting to replace Thomas with Vincent Bailey as leader, and Thomas then confirmed his resignation as council leader. On 8 May, all six members of the council's cabinet, including Thomas, joined councillors Michael Morgan and Kathryn McCaffer in leaving the Conservative group on the council to sit as independents in a Vale Independents Group led by Ben Gray. Wales Online described the move as similar to the formation of The Independent Group for Change in UK politics. The newly independent councillors formed a coalition to take over running the council on 20 May 2019 with Llantwit First Independents and Labour, led by Neil Moore again. This administration continued until the 2022 election.

== Candidates by party ==
A total of 168 candidates were standing for the 54 seats on the council (an average of 3.1 candidates per seat). Nine political parties were standing candidates in this election, plus 12 independent candidates.

The Conservatives were standing the full 54 candidates and were the only party to be standing a candidate in every ward. Of the other parties, Labour (43 candidates), Plaid Cymru (33 candidates) and the Green Party (17 candidates) were all standing in 50% or more of wards. The Llantwit First Independents were standing four candidates in the Llantwit Major ward, and there were a further 12 independent candidates (six of whom were elected as Conservative councillors are the previous election). Liberal Democrats were standing two candidates, while Abolish, Propel and Reform UK are standing one candidate each.

Party	Number of candidates	Number of wards
Conservative	54	24
Labour	43	23
Plaid Cymru	33	16
Green	17	12
Independent	12	8
Llantwit First Independent	4	1
Liberal Democrats	2	2
Abolish	1	1
Propel	1	1
Reform	1	1
Total	168 / 54	24

== Overview of results ==
Vale of Glamorgan Council remained in no overall control following this election. Labour became the largest party at the election with 25 seats - 3 seats short of a majority. This represented an increase of 11 seats on 2017, winning 6 seats from the Conservatives, 1 previously held by an independent, and 4 of the seats which were newly created by boundary changes.

The Conservatives held 13 seats, losing 10 seats they had won in 2017 (6 to Labour, 3 to Plaid and 1 to an independent candidate who had previously been elected as a Conservative). Plaid Cymru increased their share to 8 councillors, holding their 4 seats from 2017, winning 3 seats from the Conservatives and winning 1 seat which was newly created by boundary changes. The Llantwit First Independents retained all four of their councillors and did not contest any other seats. Independent councillor Kevin Mahoney retained his seat in Sully ward, while the other independent candidate in that ward did not stand for re-election and the second seat there was a gain for Labour. Two new independent councillors were elected for seats which were newly created by boundary changes: Samantha Campbell took an additional seat in Rhoose and Ian Perry won the new single-seat ward of St Nicholas & Llancarfan.

Vale of Glamorgan Council Election 2022 (Note: Votes in this table are the total for the top candidate for each party in each ward. Votes % is calculated as the votes for the party divided by the total votes in this table (49,851).)
Party	Seats	Gains	Losses	Net gain/loss	Seats %	Votes %	Votes	+/−
Labour	25	11	0	▲11	46.3	33.8	16,884	
Conservative	13	0	10	▼10	24.1	28.8	14,380	
Plaid Cymru	8	4	0	▲4	14.8	15.2	7,591	
Llantwit First Independent	4	0	0	Steady	7.4	4.0	2,008	
Independent	4	3	1	▲2	7.4	9.2	4,591	
Green	0	0	0	Steady	0.0	5.9	2,936	
Liberal Democrats	0	0	0	Steady	0.0	1.6	797	
Abolish	0	0	0	Steady	0.0	0.9	430	
Reform	0	0	0	Steady	0.0	0.4	190	
Propel	0	0	0	Steady	0.0	0.1	44	

== Candidates and results by ward ==
* = sitting councillor in this ward prior to election

=== Baruc (3 seats) ===
In the run-up to the election, the Labour candidate Ziad Alsayed was suspended by the party. In separate tweets he had called Volodymyr Zelenskyy, president of Ukraine, a "fascist" and a "Zionist". He had also described Labour leader Keir Starmer as "disgusting".

Baruc
Party	Candidate	Votes	%	±%
Plaid Cymru	Nicholas Peter Hodges*	1,122	39.6	
Plaid Cymru	Steffan Trefor Wiliam*	1,118	39.5	
Plaid Cymru	Mark Jonathan Hooper	978	34.6	
Labour	Emily Warren	770	27.2	
Labour	Pierre Codron	751	26.5	
Labour	Ziad Adel Assayed	654	23.1	
Conservative	Victoria Jaya Chaitanya Roberts	628	22.2	
Conservative	Harrison Gould	580	20.5	
Green	Aoife Blight	556	19.6	
Conservative	Ethan Shaun Harvey	544	19.2	
Green	Hugh Stephen Thomas	425	15.0	
Green	Lynden Mack	365	12.9	
Turnout		2830		
Plaid Cymru hold				
Plaid Cymru hold				
Plaid Cymru win (new seat)				

=== Buttrills (2 seats) ===
Buttrills
Party	Candidate	Votes	%	±%
Plaid Cymru	Ian James Johnson*	643	42.3	
Labour	Susan Carol Lloyd-Selby	641	42.2	
Labour	Philip Robert Johns	615	40.5	
Plaid Cymru	Nadine Rachel Marshall	572	37.7	
Conservative	Martin Drew	231	15.2	
Conservative	Neil Workman	218	14.4	
Green	Katrin Munro	118	7.8	
Turnout		1,519		
Plaid Cymru hold				
Labour hold				

=== Cadoc (4 seats) ===
Cadoc
Party	Candidate	Votes	%	±%
Labour	Gareth Michael Ball	1,101	38.4	
Labour	Catherine Iannucci	1,090	38.0	
Labour	Helen Payne	1,086	37.8	
Labour	Ewan Goodjohn	1,077	37.5	
Conservative	Rachel Nugent-Finn*	867	30.2	
Conservative	Mandy Ewington	764	26.6	
Conservative	Nathan Colin James Powell	740	25.8	
Conservative	David Jonathan Green	727	25.3	
Plaid Cymru	Gina Darling	351	12.2	
Plaid Cymru	Calum Rhys Grant	299	10.4	
Plaid Cymru	Paul King	273	9.5	
Green	Keira Barker	236	8.2	
Plaid Cymru	Byron Bowen Lewis	234	8.2	
Turnout				
Labour hold				
Labour hold				
Labour gain from Conservative				
Labour win (new seat)				

=== Castleland (2 seats) ===
Castleland
Party	Candidate	Votes	%	±%
Labour	Pamela Drake*	524	48.5	
Plaid Cymru	Millie Collins*	472	43.7	
Labour	Mark Goodjohn	445	41.2	
Plaid Cymru	Barry Ian Shaw	430	39.8	
Conservative	Thomas Anthony Browne	123	11.4	
Green	Amy Greenfield	83	7.7	
Conservative	Rose Paine	82	7.6	
Turnout				
Labour hold				
Plaid Cymru hold				

=== Cornerswell (2 seats) ===
Cornerswell
Party	Candidate	Votes	%	±%
Labour	Ian Buckley	1,120	63.3	
Labour	Rhiannon Birch*	1,003	56.7	
Conservative	Chris Sharp	436	24.6	
Conservative	Richard Stewart Gow	388	21.9	
Plaid Cymru	David Wilton	338	19.1	
Independent	Jemma Louise Angove	254	14.4	
Turnout				
Labour hold				
Labour hold				

=== Court (2 seats) ===
Court
Party	Candidate	Votes	%	±%
Labour	Bronwen Brooks*	509	51.7	
Labour	Sandra Perkes*	462	46.9	
Plaid Cymru	Stuart Paul Burnell	335	34.0	
Plaid Cymru	Dennis Alan Clarke	327	33.2	
Conservative	Michael Llewellyn Simmonds	135	13.7	
Conservative	David James Dutch	127	12.9	
Green	Elin Mai Blakemore	75	7.6	
Turnout				
Labour hold				
Labour hold				

=== Cowbridge (3 seats) ===
Candidates Geoff Cox, Hunter Jarvie and Andrew Carey Parker appear on the ballot with a blank description (having been elected as Conservative councillors in the 2017 election), while Alec Trousdell has the description "Independent/Annibynnol".

Cowbridge
Party	Candidate	Votes	%	±%
Conservative	Charles Edward Alexander Champion	1,104	52.1	
Conservative	Nicholas James Wood	975	46.0	
Conservative	Robert Fisher	960	45.3	
Labour	Paul Eldridge	925	43.7	
Independent	Alec Trousdell	679	32.1	
Independent	Geoff Cox*	611	28.9	
Independent	Hunter Jarvie*	461	21.8	
Independent	Andrew Carey Parker*	448	21.2	
Reform	Mike Hancock	190	9.0	
Turnout				
Conservative hold				
Conservative hold				
Conservative hold				

=== Dinas Powys (4 seats) ===
Dinas Powys
Party	Candidate	Votes	%	±%
Plaid Cymru	Chris Franks	1,674	52.2	
Plaid Cymru	Anne Asbrey	1,466	45.7	
Conservative	Vince Driscoll*	1,370	42.7	
Plaid Cymru	Marianne Cowpe	1,273	39.7	
Conservative	Stephen Griffiths*	1,248	38.9	
Plaid Cymru	Richard Grigg	1,217	38.0	
Conservative	Robert Crowley*	1,197	37.3	
Conservative	Andy Robertson*	1,156	36.1	
Labour	Andrew Lamb	923	28.8	
Labour	Trevor Saunders	921	28.7	
Liberal Democrats	Barry Southwell	380	11.9	
Turnout				
Plaid Cymru gain from Conservative				
Plaid Cymru gain from Conservative				
Conservative hold				
Plaid Cymru gain from Conservative				

=== Dyfan (2 seats) ===
Dyfan ward
Party	Candidate	Votes	%	±%
Labour	Emma Jane Goodjohn	774	50.1	
Labour	Belinda Loveluck-Edwards	740	47.9	
Conservative	Vincent James Bailey	607	39.3	
Conservative	Leighton Owen Rowlands	572	37.0	
Plaid Cymru	John Mcallister	163	10.6	
Plaid Cymru	Timothy Patrick Johnson	136	8.8	
Green	Sharon Catherine Richards	96	6.2	
Majority		167		
Turnout				
Labour gain from Conservative				
Labour gain from Conservative				

=== Gibbonsdown (2 seats) ===
Gibbonsdown
Party	Candidate	Votes	%	±%
Labour	Julie Aviet*	674	68.3	
Labour	Margaret Rosemary Wilkinson*	600	60.8	
Conservative	Rhian Cummings	192	19.5	
Conservative	Benjamin Lloyd Driscoll	168	17.0	
Plaid Cymru	Janet Mary Johnson	122	12.4	
Plaid Cymru	David Ian Weston	103	10.4	
Green	Paul Granjon	71	7.2	
Propel	Nicola Suzanne Reekie	44	4.5	
Turnout				
Labour hold				
Labour hold				

=== Illtyd (3 seats) ===
Illtyd
Party	Candidate	Votes	%	±%
Labour	Naomi Marshallsea	1,342	56.8	
Labour	Howard Clive Hamilton	1,177	49.8	
Conservative	Janice Charles*	953	40.3	
Conservative	Oliver Batt	894	37.8	
Conservative	Harry Driscoll	819	34.6	
Plaid Cymru	Taif Ball	589	24.9	
Plaid Cymru	Julie Ann Mckinney	403	17.0	
Green	Rachel Knox	396	16.7	
Plaid Cymru	Tim Mckinney	285	12.1	
Green	Don Reynolds	236	10.1	
Turnout				
Labour gain from Conservative				
Labour gain from Conservative				
Conservative hold				

=== Llandough (1 seat) ===
Llandough ward
Party	Candidate	Votes	%	±%
Conservative	George Carroll	720	72.9	−12.8
Labour	Jo Byworth-Morgan	268	27.1	−9.2
Majority		452	45.7	
Turnout		988		
Conservative hold		Swing		

=== Llandow (1 seat) ===
Llandow
Party	Candidate	Votes	%	±%
Conservative	Christine Ann Cave*	466	55.6	−20.4
Labour	Huw Powell	255	30.4	+6.4
Plaid Cymru	Andrew Arthur Murphy	117	14.0	N/A
Majority		167	19.9	−32.0
Turnout		838		
Conservative hold		Swing		

=== Llantwit Major (4 seats) ===
Llantwit Major
Party	Candidate	Votes	%	±%
Llantwit First Independent	Gwyn John*	2,008	62.9	
Llantwit First Independent	Sally Margaret Hanks*	1,795	56.2	
Llantwit First Independent	Jayne Margaret Norman*	1,459	45.7	
Llantwit First Independent	Eddie Williams*	1,443	45.2	
Labour	Bryan Godsell	902	28.3	
Conservative	Bob Gant	890	27.9	
Labour	Tracy Hickson	824	25.8	
Labour	Lorna Mccourt	742	23.2	
Conservative	Gordon Wilkie	725	22.7	
Labour	Trevor Neatherway	694	21.7	
Conservative	John Arthur Moisan	650	20.4	
Conservative	Andy Montgomery	635	19.9	
Green	Charlotte Alexandra Richards	302	9.5	
Plaid Cymru	David Heald	254	8.0	
Turnout				
Llantwit First Independent hold				
Llantwit First Independent hold				
Llantwit First Independent hold				
Llantwit First Independent hold				

=== Peterston-Super-Ely (1 seat) ===
Michael Morgan was elected as a Conservative councillor in the 2017 election, and held his seat in this election. Morgan's share of the vote dropped by 19.0% on 2017.

Peterston-Super-Ely ward
Party	Candidate	Votes	%	±%
Independent	Michael Morgan	486	59.1	+59.1
Conservative	Gary John Allman	178	21.7	−56.4
Labour	Eleri Cubbage	158	19.2	−2.7
Majority		308	37.5	
Turnout		822		
Independent gain from Conservative		Swing		

=== Plymouth (2 seats) ===
Ben Gray and Kathryn McCaffer were elected as a Conservative councillor in the 2017 election.

Plymouth ward
Party	Candidate	Votes	%	±%
Conservative	Rhys Thomas	882	41.2	
Conservative	Anthony Monroe Ernest	864	40.4	
Labour	Richard Cox	803	37.5	
Independent	Kathryn Mccaffer	490	22.9	
Independent	Ben Gray	447	20.9	
Liberal Democrats	Alex Wilson	417	19.5	
Plaid Cymru	Adrian Roper	375	17.5	
Majority		79		
Turnout				
Conservative hold		Swing		
Conservative hold		Swing		

=== Rhoose (3 seats) ===
Rhoose
Party	Candidate	Votes	%	±%
Conservative	Gillian Bruce	915	52.2	
Independent	Samantha Campbell	895	51.1	
Conservative	William Hennessy	837	47.7	
Conservative	Kyle Bulley	833	47.5	
Labour	Mark Lloyd-Selby	697	39.8	
Plaid Cymru	Shirley Ann Hodges	505	28.8	
Abolish	Stuart James Field	430	24.5	
Green	Jane Allely	147	8.4	
Turnout				
Conservative hold				
Conservative hold				
Independent win (new seat)				

=== St Athan (2 seats) ===
St Athan's seats increased from one in 2017 to two at this election.

St Athan ward
Party	Candidate	Votes	%	±%
Conservative	Stephen James Haines	484	53.0	
Labour	Julie Lynch-Wilson	474	51.9	
Independent	John William Thomas	468	51.2	
Conservative	Chloe Louise Marie Hunt	402	44.0	
Majority		10		
Turnout				
Conservative hold		Swing		
Labour win (new seat)				

=== St Augustines (3 seats) ===
Green candidate Anthony Slaughter was the leader of the Wales Green Party during this election.

St Augustine
Party	Candidate	Votes	%	±%
Labour	Ruba Sivagnanam*	1,178	49.7	
Labour	Elliot Penn	1,146	48.3	
Labour	Neil Christopher Thomas*	1,024	43.2	
Conservative	Jeff Tree	638	26.9	
Conservative	Robin Jonathan Smith	620	26.1	
Conservative	Rod Thomas	598	25.2	
Green	Anthony David Slaughter	481	20.3	
Plaid Cymru	Sian Rees	351	14.8	
Green	Christine Glossop	332	14.0	
Plaid Cymru	Rhodri Davies	323	13.6	
Green	Thomas Geoffrey Blenkinsop	253	10.7	
Plaid Cymru	Matthew Hutchinson	169	7.1	
Turnout				
Labour hold				
Labour hold				
Labour win (new seat)				

=== St Brides Major (2 seats) ===
St Brides Major
Party	Candidate	Votes	%	±%
Labour	Carys Stallard	764	46.3	
Labour	Jo Protheroe	735	44.5	
Conservative	Paul Silcox	643	38.9	
Conservative	Robert Tate	606	36.7	
Green	Emma Hayhurst	375	22.7	
Plaid Cymru	Tim Ruscoe	180	10.9	
Turnout				
Labour gain from Conservative				
Labour win (new seat)				

=== St Nicholas & Llancarfan (1 seat) ===
St Nicholas & Llancarfan ward was newly created for this election; Gordon Kemp was a sitting councillor for Rhoose ward prior to this election. Ian Perry previously unsuccessfully stood as a Plaid Cymru candidate in Wenvoe ward in 2017.

St Nicholas & Llancarfan
Party	Candidate	Votes	%	±%
Independent	Ian Anthony Neil Perry	460	53.5	N/A
Conservative	Gordon Christopher Kemp*	400	46.5	N/A
Majority		60	7.0	N/A
Turnout		860		
Independent win (new seat)				

=== Stanwell (2 seats) ===
Stanwell ward
Party	Candidate	Votes	%	±%
Labour	Lis Burnett	1,068	76.1	
Labour	Mark Wilson	1,033	73.7	
Conservative	Steve Morgan	359	25.6	
Conservative	Anthony John Sawyer	345	24.6	
Majority		709		
Turnout				
Labour hold		Swing		
Labour hold		Swing		

=== Sully (2 seats) ===
Sully ward
Party	Candidate	Votes	%	±%
Independent	Kevin Mahoney	1,113	79.1	
Labour	Wendy Gilligan	593	42.1	
Conservative	Matthew Stuart Hall	557	39.6	
Conservative	Kel Alderman	552	39.2	
Majority		520		
Turnout				
Independent hold		Swing		
Labour gain from Independent		Swing		

=== Wenvoe (1 seat) ===
Wenvoe ward
Party	Candidate	Votes	%	±%
Conservative	Russell Edward Godfrey	602	58.8	+1.1
Labour	Charlotte Louise Davies	421	41.2	+26.5
Majority		181	17.7	−25.1
Turnout		1023		
Conservative hold		Swing	-13.8	

== Changes 2022-2027 ==
=== By-elections ===
==== Illtyd (2025) ====
A by-election was held following the death of Labour councillor, Howard Hamilton. The election was won by Reform UK, their first councillor on Vale of Glamorgan Council.

Illtyd by-election, 11 September 2025
Party	Candidate	Votes	%	±%
Reform	Brandon Dodd	729		
Plaid Cymru	Taif Ball	657		
Conservative	Vincent Bailey	445		
Labour	Aled Blake	414		
Green	Aoife Blight	85		
Majority		72		
Reform gain from Labour				
