= Penarth Town Council =

Community council in Vale of Glamorgan, Wales

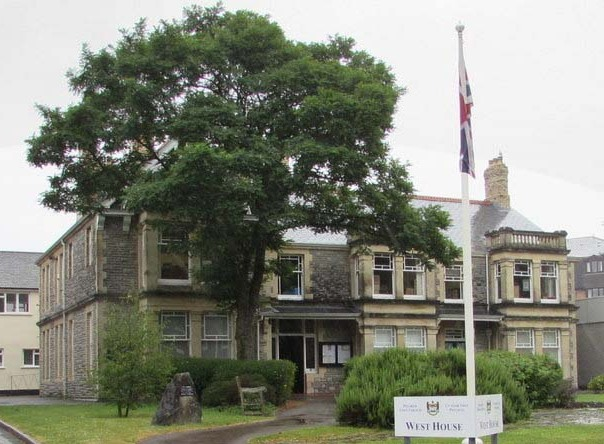

Type
- Type: Town council

History
- Founded: 1974

Leadership
- Mayor: Melissa Rabiotti(2023/24)
- Seats: 16

Meeting place
- West House, Stanwell Road, Penarth

Website
- www.penarthtowncouncil.gov.uk

Penarth Town Council is an elected community council serving the town of Penarth in the Vale of Glamorgan, Wales.

== Background ==
Penarth has had a council of one form or another since the 1890s. Penarth Town Council came into existence in 1974 at the same time as local government reorganisation.

Town councillors represent Penarth's views on various committees and to wider public bodies. It gives out awards and grants. The council is responsible for Penarth Cemetery (which was originally acquired by Penarth Urban District Council in 1903) and the town allotments.

The council also manages three important buildings in the town, namely West House (the council headquarters), The Paget Rooms (a theatre in the town centre) and The Turner House Art Gallery . West House was purchased from Vale of Glamorgan Council for £100,000 and is the location for the council chamber (where council meetings are held), a Register Office (for births and deaths) and is a licensed wedding venue.

== Representation ==
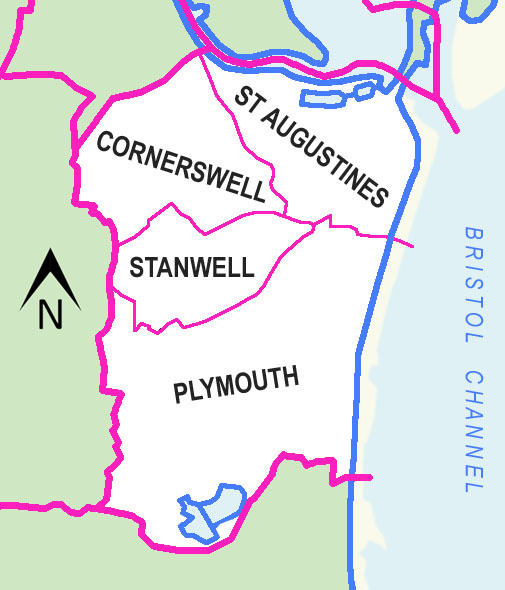
Electoral wards of Penarth

Sixteen councillors are elected from the four electoral wards in the town, namely: Cornerswell (4), Plymouth (4), St Augustine's (5) and Stanwell (3). In 2022 thirteen of the seats were won by the Labour Party and one by the Conservatives There was also two independents elected.

In January 2018 the council supported recommendations that five senior councillors would receive an allowance of £500 per year.

== Mayor ==
The council elects a town mayor and deputy mayor annually.

== Council composition ==
Following the election on 4 May 2017 Labour were the largest party. The Conservatives increased their numbers from four to five, winning back a seat from Labour for the St Augustine's ward. Candidates also stood for Plaid Cymru, the Liberal Democrats, the Green Party and Penarth First Independents, though these other parties didn't win any seats. Stanwell councillor Janice Birch, who'd first been elected in 1975, stood down at this election.

At May 2017 election
Ward	Conservative	Labour
Cornerswell	1	3
Plymouth	3	1
St Augustine's	1	4
Stanwell	0	3
Total	5	11
