= Llantwit First Independents =

Llantwit First Independents Annibynwyr Cyntaf Llantwit
- Leader: Gwyn John
- Founded: 19 March 2007; 18 years ago
- Headquarters: Llantwit Major
- Vale of Glamorgan Council: 4 / 54

Website
- www.facebook.com/LlantwitFirst/

Llantwit First Independents (Welsh: Annibynwyr Cyntaf Llantwit) are a political party created in 2004 who stand candidates for election in the town of Llantwit Major, Vale of Glamorgan, Wales. Their elected councillors sit on Llantwit Major Town Council and represent the Llantwit Major ward on the Vale of Glamorgan Council.

Llantwit First Independents were registered as a political party on 19 March 2007 and re-registered in March 2017.

== Town council ==
Llantwit First Independents councillors have been elected to Llantwit major town council, though in July 2008 the Llantwit first town mayor, Molly Lane and her husband, Councillor David Lane, resigned from the group to join the Conservative Party, citing disagreements on a number of issues.

The Llantwit First Independents have had a power struggle with the Conservative Party on the town council, with independents having a very small majority. However, in May 2017 they won 12 of the 14 town council seats.

== County council ==
Following the 2004 Vale of Glamorgan Council election the Llantwit Major ward was represented by three independent county councillors and one Conservative. At the 2008 Vale of Glamorgan Council election the Independent councillors in the ward stood under the Llantwit First Independents banner, retaining the three independent seats.

At the 2012 county council election Llantwit First Independents won all four Llantwit Major seats. The Labour Party became the largest party on the county council but did not have a majority, so governed for the next five years in coalition with the Llantwit First Independents. Llantwit councillor Eric Hacker was elected mayor of the Vale of Glamorgan for 12 months, from 23 May 2012. Llantwit councillor Eddie Williams became deputy mayor of the county in May 2016.

A by-election took place on 26 March 2015 following the death of Llantwit first councillor Keith Geary. The seat was regained by the Conservatives. At the May 2017 county council election Llantwit First Independents won all four Llanwit Major seats, including one lost at the by-election. They claimed that their previous coalition with Labour had benefited Llanwit Major with funding for local school and library investment. However, the 2017 election had restored the Conservative Party as the largest council group, and a coalition with two Sully independent councillors was likely.

On 24 May 2019 the four Llantwit First councillors joined a new governing coalition on the council, led by Labour councillor, Neil Moore.

At the May 2022 county council election, Llantwit First Independents held all four of their seats in Llantwit Major. There was a slight reduction in their overall share of the votes in the ward from 56.4% in 2017 to 50.3% in 2022, but their majority over the fifth place candidate increased.
