= Cornerswell =

Electoral ward in the Vale of Glamorgan, Wales

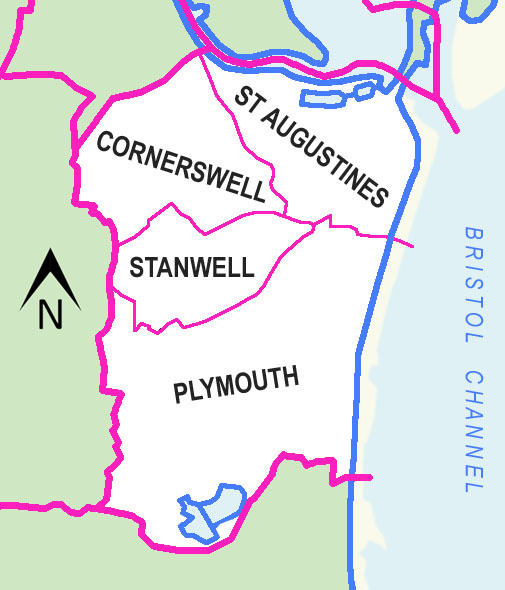
Electoral wards of Penarth, with Cornerswell towards the northwest

Cornerswell is an electoral ward in Penarth, Vale of Glamorgan, Wales. It elects two county councillors to the Vale of Glamorgan Council and four town councillors to Penarth Town Council.

== Description ==
The Cornerswell ward covers the residential area west of Penarth town centre including Cogan and the area of Penarth north of Cornerswell Road. The St Augustine's ward lies to the east, Stanwell to the south and Llandough to the north. Two county councillors are elected from Cornerswell to the Vale of Glamorgan Council and four town councillors to Penarth Town Council.

According to the 2011 census the population of the ward was 5,353 (with 658 being able to read, speak or write Welsh).

== Election results ==
=== Town Council ===
Three Labour councillors (including Rhiannon Birch who was also a county councillor for the ward) and one Conservative councillor were elected to Penarth Town Council at the May 2017 elections.

=== County Council ===
At the May 2017 Vale of Glamorgan council elections both seats were won by Welsh Labour. Councillors Rhiannon Birch and Peter King had represented the ward since 2012 (Cllr Birch had also represented the ward between 2004 and 2008). Between 1995 and 2012 Cornerswell had elected a mixture of Labour and Conservative councillors to the county council.

Representation 1995 – date
| Election | Conservative | Labour |
| 2017 | 0 | 2 |
| 2012 | 0 | 2 |
| 2008 | 2 | 0 |
| 2004 | 0 | 2 |
| 1999 | 1 | 1 |
| 1995 | 0 | 2 |
