= Llantwit Major (electoral ward) =

- Electoral ward
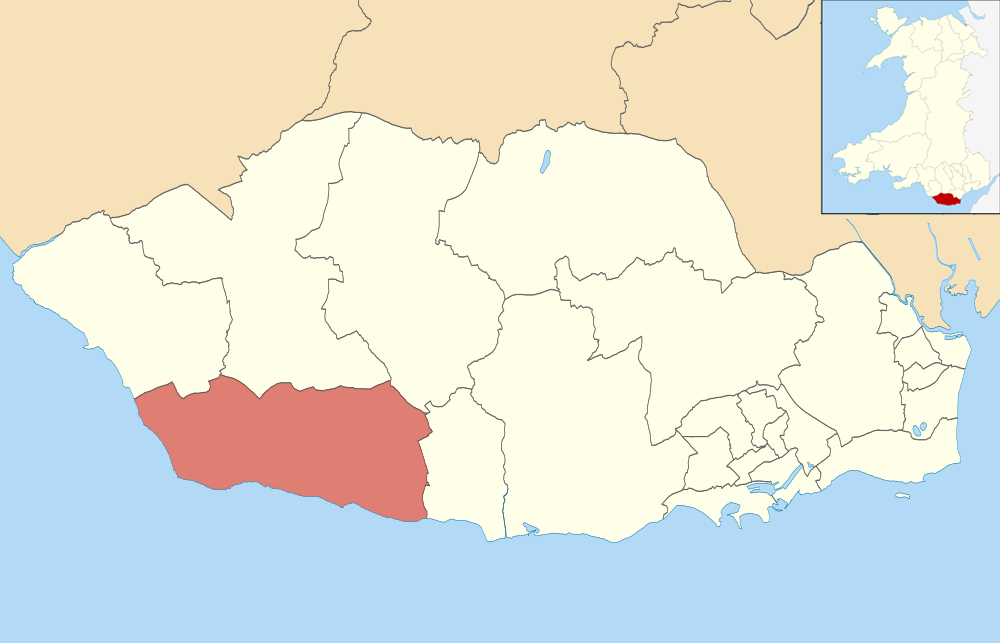
- Location of the (pre-2022) Llantwit Major ward within the Vale of Glamorgan
- Population: 10,621 (2011 census)
- Community: Llan-maes, Llantwit Major
- Principal area: Vale of Glamorgan
- Country: Wales
- Sovereign state: United Kingdom
- UK Parliament: Vale of Glamorgan
- Senedd Cymru – Welsh Parliament: Vale of Glamorgan
- Councillors: 4 (County)

Llantwit Major is an electoral ward in the Vale of Glamorgan, Wales. It covers its namesake town of Llantwit Major and neighbouring village of Llanmaes. The ward elects four county councillors to the Vale of Glamorgan Council.

According to the 2011 census the population of the ward was 10,621.

== Boundary changes ==
In 2022 St Donats community was transferred to the St Brides Major ward, as a result of recommendations from the Local Democracy and Boundary Commission for Wales. However, Llantwit Major retained four county councillors.

== Election results ==
=== 2022 Vale of Glamorgan ===
All four sitting Llantwit First councillors retained their seats.

=== 2017 Vale of Glamorgan ===
At the May 2017 County Council elections all four seats were won by candidates standing as Llantwit First Independents, increasing their numbers by one.

2017 Vale of Glamorgan Council election
Party	Candidate	Votes	%	±%
Llantwit First Independent	Gwyn John *	2209		
Llantwit First Independent	Sally Margaret Hanks	1984		
Llantwit First Independent	Eddie Williams *	1588		
Llantwit First Independent	Jayne Margaret Norman	1527		
Conservative	Tony Bennett *	1360		
Conservative	John Colin Deakin	1154		
Conservative	Bob Gant	999		
Conservative	Gordon Wilkie	908		
Labour	James Cullinane	670		
Independent	Ceri Malessa-Thompson	254		
UKIP	Melanie J. Hunter-Clarke	112		
UKIP	Robin Hunter-Clarke	112		
UKIP	Anthony Frederick Raybould	78		

=== 2012 Vale of Glamorgan/2015 by-election ===
Following the 2012 election Llantwit First Independent councillor Eric Hacker was elected as mayor of the county council for the ensuing 12 months. Llantwit First Independents supported the minority Labour Group to give Labour a majority control of the county council. Councillor Keith Geary died on 4 January 2015, leaving a seat vacant.

At the by-election on 26 March 2015 the vacant seat was won by Tony Bennett for the Conservatives, by 12 votes.

2012 Vale of Glamorgan Council election
Party	Candidate	Votes	%	±%
Llantwit First Independent	Gwyn John *	2068		
Llantwit First Independent	Eric Hacker *	1603		
Llantwit First Independent	Edward Williams	1490		
Llantwit First Independent	Keith Geary	1327		
Conservative	John Clifford *	813		
Conservative	Ralph Austin	759		
Conservative	Russell Downe	544		
Labour	Graham Price	541		
Conservative	Bob Gant	536		
Labour	Matthew Batchelor	471		
Labour	Katie Denman	411		
Plaid Cymru	Dafydd Stephens	269		

=== 2008 Vale of Glamorgan ===
2008 Vale of Glamorgan Council election
Party	Candidate	Votes	%	±%
Llantwit First Independent	Gwyn John *	1894		
Llantwit First Independent	Sally Bagstaff	1748		
Llantwit First Independent	Eric Hacker *	1470		
Conservative	John Clifford *	1291		
Llantwit First Independent	Ann Matthews	1164		
Conservative	Ralph Austin	1127		
Conservative	Robert Gant	901		
Conservative	Mary Williams	874		
Labour	Brian Godsell	438		
Labour	Graham Price	400		
Labour	Sandra Waldron-Kelly	348		
Plaid Cymru	Dafydd Stephens	270		
Independent	Paul Stephens	262		

* = sitting councillor prior to the election

=== 1973–1996 ===
Between 1973 and 1996 Llantwit Major was a ward to the Vale of Glamorgan Borough Council, electing 3 councillors initially, then 4 councillors from 1983. The ward was represented by a mixture of Labour and Conservative councillors.
