= Plymouth (Penarth electoral ward) =

Electoral ward in Wales

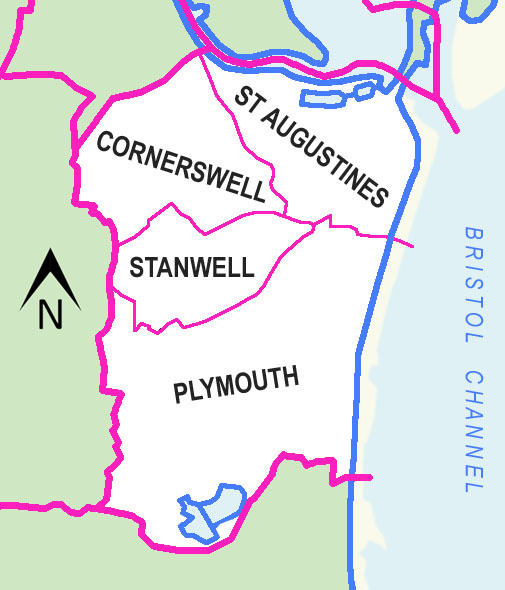
Plymouth ward location in Penarth

Plymouth is an electoral ward in the town of Penarth, Vale of Glamorgan, Wales. It covers the more affluent part of the town south of the town centre. It stretches either side of Lavernock Road which includes Lower Penarth and Cosmeston (including Glamorganshire Golf Club and Cosmeston Lakes). The ward elects two county councillors to Vale of Glamorgan Council and four councillors to Penarth Town Council. A majority of its councillors represent the Conservative Party.

The name of the ward refers to Plymouth Road, and to the Earls of Plymouth, who were major landowners in the area.

According to the 2011 census, the population of the ward was 5,836.

Dinas Powys	Stanwell	St Augustine's
Dinas Powys	Plymouth
Sully

== Background ==
Following The County Borough of The Vale of Glamorgan (Electoral Changes) Order 2002 the county ward of Alexandra was divided to become St Augustine's and Plymouth wards, effective from October 2003 for preliminary electoral proceedings, but fully effective at the May 2004 Vale of Glamorgan Council elections. However, Plymouth had been a community ward for elections to Penarth Town Council prior to that.

== County council elections ==
2017 Vale of Glamorgan Council election
Party	Candidate	Votes	%	±%
Conservative	Ben Gray	894		
Conservative	Kathryn Frances McCaffer	796		
Labour	Angela Thomas	643		
Independent	Anthony Ernest	505		
Independent	Clive Williams *	443		
Independent	Victoria Humphries	302		
Green	Tony Cooke	288		
Plaid Cymru	Gareth Clubb	240		
Liberal Democrats	Roger Pinkham	169		

* = sitting councillor prior to the election

== Town Council elections ==
Councillor Ben Gray (elected in 2017) left the Conservative party and sat as an independent. On 19 February 2026 a by-election was held in the ward, after Gray was disqualified from the council for not attending meetings for 6 months. The by-election was won by Zak Weaver for Reform UK, with 38& of the vote, despite Weaver having initially stood for the Conservative Party and appearing on the ballot as Conservative. He had changed party and joined Reform UK a week before the election.

At the Penarth Town Council election on 4 May 2017, two long-standing councillors, Anthony Ernest and Clive Williams, lost their seats after choosing to stand as independents. Williams had been de-selected by the Conservatives in favour of Martin Turner and Kathryn McCaffer. Two other sitting councillors, Ian Courtney (Labour) and Wendy van den Brom (Conservative), were also replaced by the voters.

Penarth Town Council election, May 2017
Party	Candidate	Votes	%	±%
Conservative	Ben Gray	916		
Conservative	Kathryn Frances McCaffer	822		
Conservative	Martin Turner	760		
Labour	Angela Thomas	739		
Independent	Anthony Ernest *	721		
Penarth First	Clive Williams *	709		
Labour	Richard Cox	673		
Labour	Ian Courtney *	660		
Conservative	Wendy van den Brom *	652		
Penarth First	Paul Church	634		
Penarth First	Victoria Humphries	584		
Penarth First	Graham Humphries	476		

* = sitting councillor prior to the election
