= St Augustine's (electoral ward) =

Electoral ward in the Vale of Glamorgan, Wales

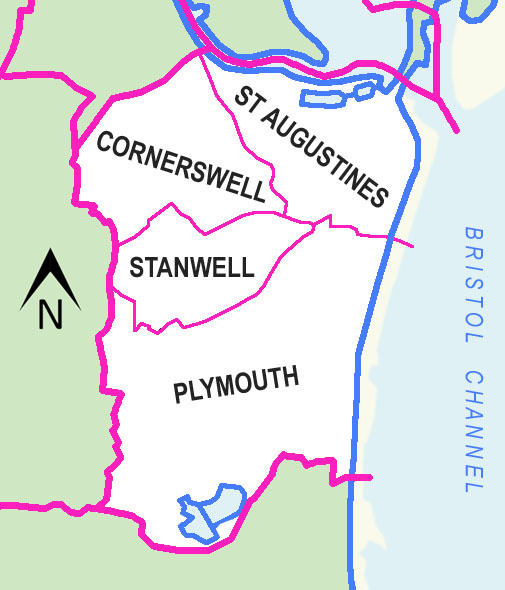
St Augustine's ward location in Penarth

St Augustine's is an electoral ward in the town of Penarth, Vale of Glamorgan, Wales. It covers Penarth Head and Penarth Marina northeast of the town centre, including the parish church of St Augustine's. The ward elects three county councillors to Vale of Glamorgan Council and five councillors to Penarth Town Council. The ward is currently represented by the Labour Party.

According to the 2011 census the population of the ward was 6,478.

Llandough	Grangetown, Cardiff	Butetown, Cardiff
Cornerswell	St Augustine's
Stanwell	Plymouth

== Background ==
Following The County Borough of The Vale of Glamorgan (Electoral Changes) Order 2002 the county ward of Alexandra was divided to become St Augustine's and Plymouth wards, effective from October 2003 for preliminary electoral proceedings but fully effective at the May 2004 Vale of Glamorgan Council elections. However, St Augustine's had been a community ward for elections to Penarth Town Council prior to this.

In 2022 the number of county councillors was increased from two, to three.

== County council elections ==
=== Vale of Glamorgan Council ===
On 4 May 2017 Labour held on to their two seats they'd won from the Conservatives at the 2012 county council election. Sitting councillor Lis Burnett decided to stand in the neighbouring ward of Stanwell, while Cllr Gwyn Roberts decided not to stand for re-election (though stood in the election for the town council).

Vale of Glamorgan Council election, May 2017
Party	Candidate	Votes	%	±%
Labour	Ruba Sivagnanam	967		
Labour	Neil Christopher Thomas	827		
Conservative	Martin James Turner	737		
Conservative	Wendy van den Brom	633		
Green	Anthony Slaughter	436		
Independent	Paul Church	312		
Plaid Cymru	Anne Greagsby	288		
Plaid Cymru	Aled Thomas	217		
Independent	Graham Humphries	186		
Green	Gareth Snaith	157		
Liberal Democrats	Robin Lynn	138		
Liberal Democrats	Heath John Marshall	121		

=== South Glamorgan County Council ===
At the 1985, 1989 and 1993 county elections, St Augustine's elected a county councillor to South Glamorgan County Council. The Labour candidate won each of these elections.

== Town Council elections ==
At the Penarth Town Council election on 4 May 2017 the Conservatives regained a seat they'd lost at the 2012 election. The former Mayor of Penarth, Gwyn Roberts, lost his seat by three votes.

Penarth Town Council election, May 2017
Party	Candidate	Votes	%	±%
Labour	Yvonne Clare Murphy	1134		
Labour	Liz Fahy	1126		
Labour	Mike Cuddy	1119		
Labour	Nigel Humphrey	1003		
Conservative	Gary Allman	943		
Labour	Gwyn Roberts	940		
Green	Anthony Slaughter	916		
Conservative	Simon Stranks	903		
Plaid Cymru	Anne Greagsby	667		
Plaid Cymru	Aled Thomas	620		
