= Dinas Powys (electoral ward) =

Electoral division in the Vale of Glamorgan, Wales

Dinas Powys is an electoral ward in the Vale of Glamorgan, Wales. It covers its namesake community of Dinas Powys and the neighbouring Michaelston-le-Pit and Leckwith to the north. The ward elects four county councillors to the Vale of Glamorgan Council.

According to the 2011 census the population of the ward was 7,799.

== Election results ==
At the May 2017 County Council elections all four seats were won by the Conservative Party. One of the losing councillors was Plaid Cymru's Chris Franks, who had represented the ward since 2001 and had been leader of the Plaid Cymru group on the County Council.

2017 Vale of Glamorgan Council election
Party	Candidate	Votes	%	±%
Conservative	Robert Crowley	1425		
Conservative	Vince Driscoll	1420		
Conservative	Steve Griffiths	1385		
Conservative	Andy Robertson	1303		
Plaid Cymru	Chris Franks *	1270		
Plaid Cymru	Val Hartrey *	1100		
Plaid Cymru	Keith Hatton *	909		
Plaid Cymru	Richard Grigg	806		
Labour	Jill Davies	565		
Independent	Christopher John Williams *	507		
Independent	John Maitland-Evans	438		
Labour	Trevor George Robert Saunders	431		
Labour	Anthony Lewis	413		
Labour	John Boddy	366		
Independent	Thomas Maitland-Evans	365		
Green	Hilary May	323		

Prior to May 2017 the ward was known as "The People’s Republic of Plaid", having been represented by three Plaid Cymru councillors and one Independent (Christopher Williams had been elected initially for Plaid Cymru but changed to Independent in 2014).

2012 Vale of Glamorgan Council election
Party	Candidate	Votes	%	±%
Plaid Cymru	Christopher Franks	1515		
Plaid Cymru	Valerie Hartrey *	1418		
Plaid Cymru	Keith Hatton *	1265		
Plaid Cymru	Christopher Williams *	1223		
Conservative	Vince Driscoll	1122		
Conservative	Robert Foxwell	1035		
Conservative	Nigel Streeter	1007		
Conservative	Andrew Robertson	970		
Labour	Jill Davies	602		
Labour	Terry Davies	537		
Labour	Wendy Gilligan	522		
Labour	John Williams	499		

* = sitting councillor prior to the election

Plaid Cymru had held all four county council seats since 1995.
