= Stanwell (Penarth electoral ward) =

Electoral ward in the Vale of Glamorgan, Wales

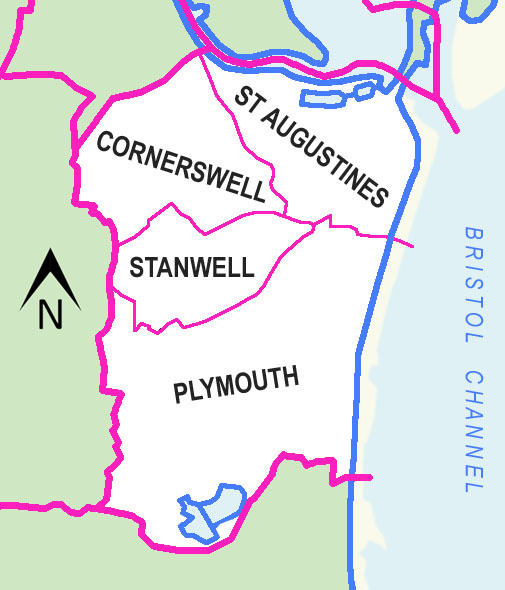
Electoral wards of Penarth, with Stanwell towards the centre

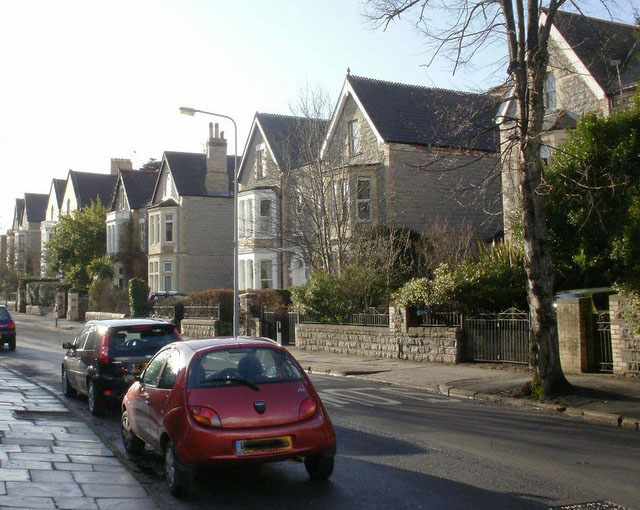
Stanwell Road

Stanwell is an electoral ward in Penarth, Vale of Glamorgan, Wales. It elects two county councillors to the Vale of Glamorgan Council and three town councillors to Penarth Town Council.

== Description ==
The Stanwell ward covers the residential area southwest of Penarth town centre including the neighbourhoods of Morristown and the area around Stanwell Road and Stanwell Comprehensive School. The Penarth wards of Cornerswell and Plymouth lie to the north and south respectively, while the county ward of Dinas Powys is located to the west. Two county councillors are elected from the Stanwell ward to the Vale of Glamorgan Council and three town councillors to Penarth Town Council.

According to the 2011 census the population of the ward was 4,416.

== Election results ==
=== Town council ===
Three Labour councillors were elected to Penarth Town Council at the May 2017 elections including Mark Robert Wilson who is also a county councillor for the ward.

=== Vale of Glamorgan Council ===
At the May 2017 Vale of Glamorgan council elections both seats were won by Welsh Labour. One of the councillors, Lis Burnett, had represented the neighbouring St Augustine's ward prior to the election, but had decided not to stand again in that ward after initiating several controversial schemes during her tenure.

Since 1995 the Stanwell ward has consistently elected Labour councillors to the county council.

=== South Glamorgan County Council ===
At the 1985, 1989 and 1993 county elections, Stanwell elected a county councillor to South Glamorgan County Council. The Labour candidate won each of these elections.
