= Chris Franks =

Welsh politician

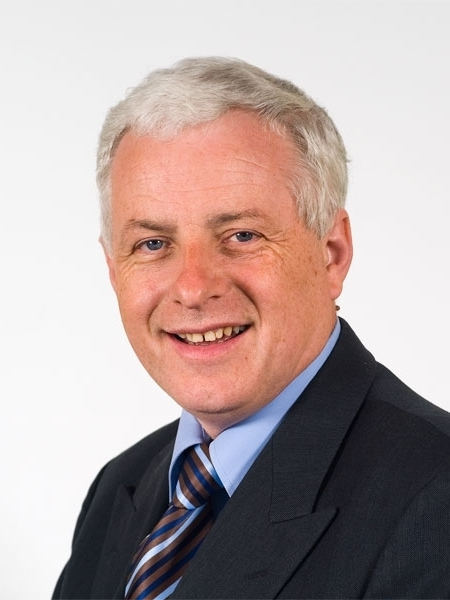
- Official portrait, 2007

Member of the Welsh Assembly for South Wales Central
- In office 3 May 2007 – 3 May 2011
- Preceded by: Owen John Thomas
- Succeeded by: Eluned Parrott

Assembly Commissioner
- In office 18 September 2007 – 3 May 2011
- Preceded by: Elin Jones
- Succeeded by: Rhodri Glyn Thomas

Personal details
- Born: 2 August 1951 (age 74) Cardiff, Wales
- Party: Plaid Cymru

Christopher Paul Franks (born 2 August 1951) is a Plaid Cymru Politician. He was a member of the National Assembly for Wales between 2007 and 2011 for the South Wales Central constituency, and Vale of Glamorgan councillor for Dinas Powys from 2004-2017 and 2017–present. He has previously led the Plaid Cymru group on the council.

== Career ==
Franks was born in Cardiff, and educated at Llandaff College. He qualified as a civil engineer, and worked in the Highways and Transport Department of a local authority.

== Political career ==
=== Local Government ===
Franks was a Plaid Cymru councillor for Dinas Powys on South Glamorgan County Council from 1981 until the council's dissolution. He was elected to Vale of Glamorgan Council from Dinas Powys ward, and also to Dinas Powys Community Council. In 2001, he was chosen as Plaid Cymru group leader on the Vale of Glamorgan Council.

After the 2004 elections to Vale of Glamorgan Council the Plaid Cymru group found itself with the 'balance of power' and Franks held meetings with both the Conservative and Labour leaders. Eventually, the Conservatives formed a minority administration which lasted until November 2006 when a crisis over social services cuts led to a vote of no confidence in the Conservative leader being passed. Franks declared that an all-party coalition was preferable. A coalition between Labour, Plaid Cymru and Independent councillors was agreed that December under which Franks became the cabinet member for Legal and Public Protection, a post that he no longer holds. Franks was neutral in his support for the coalition having abstained in the vote of no confidence.

In the 2017 elections, Franks lost his seat to the Conservatives but regained his seat in the 2022 elections.

=== National Assembly for Wales and UK Parliament ===
Franks contested the Vale of Glamorgan constituency in the 1999 and 2003 elections to the National Assembly for Wales, and the UK Parliament constituency in the 2001 General Election, and was unsuccessful in all cases. He also challenged Owen John Thomas for the top placement on Plaid Cymru's party list for the South Wales Central region for the 2003 election, but was unsuccessful.

Franks was selected in May 2006 as second on Plaid Cymru's list for South Wales Central following the retirement of Owen John Thomas; Plaid had won two seats from the regional list in both previous elections to the Assembly. He duly retained the seat in the 2007 election.

== Offices held ==
Senedd
Preceded by Owen John Thomas	Assembly Member for South Wales Central; 2007 – 2011	Succeeded by Eluned Parrott
Preceded by Elin Jones	Assembly Commission; 2007 (from Sept 18)–present	Incumbent
Party political offices
Preceded by Jill Evans	Vice President of Plaid Cymru; 2010–2013	Position abolished
