= Lavernock Battery =

Weapons facility built in Wales

Coordinates: 51.4065°N 3.1701°W

Lavernock Battery was built at Lavernock Point, Wales on the recommendations of the 1860 Royal Commission during the late 1860s to protect the ports of the Severn Estuary. It was replaced by a new anti-aircraft battery during World War II that was equipped with four heavy anti-aircraft guns.

== History ==
The Palmerston government initiated a large system of coastal fortifications and Lavernock Battery was the most northerly of a chain of defences across the Bristol Channel, protecting the access to Bristol and Cardiff. Completed in 1870, the battery was initially armed with three rifled muzzle-loading (RML) seven-inch (180 mm) Mk III guns on disappearing carriages. An 1895 inventory reported a fourth seven-inch gun. By 1903 all four guns had been replaced by two breech-loading six-inch (152 mm) Mk VII guns.

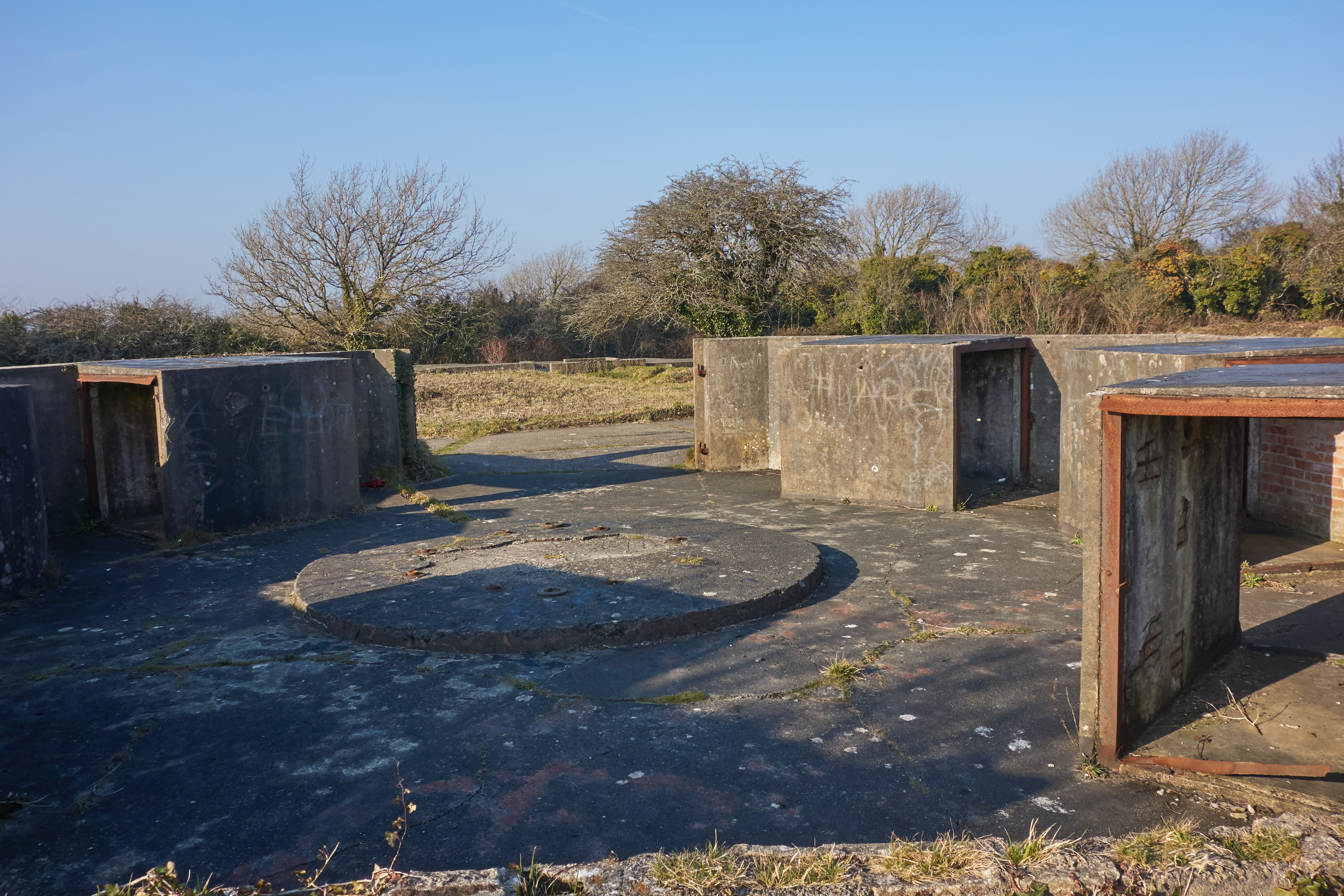
Ruined gun emplacements at Lavernock Battery

The two 6-inch guns formed part of the Fixed Defences, Severn Scheme and protected the Atlantic shipping convoy de-grouping zone between Cardiff, Barry and Flat Holm. They were manned by men of the 531st (Glamorgan) Coast Regiment, Royal Artillery.

On 13 May 1897, Guglielmo Marconi sent the world's first ever wireless communication over open sea. The experiment transmitted a message over the Bristol Channel from Flat Holm Island to Lavernock Point in Penarth, a distance of 6 kilometres (3.7 mi). The message read "Are you ready". The transmitting equipment was almost immediately relocated to Brean Down Fort on the Somerset coast, stretching the range to 16 kilometres (9.9 mi).

== Description ==
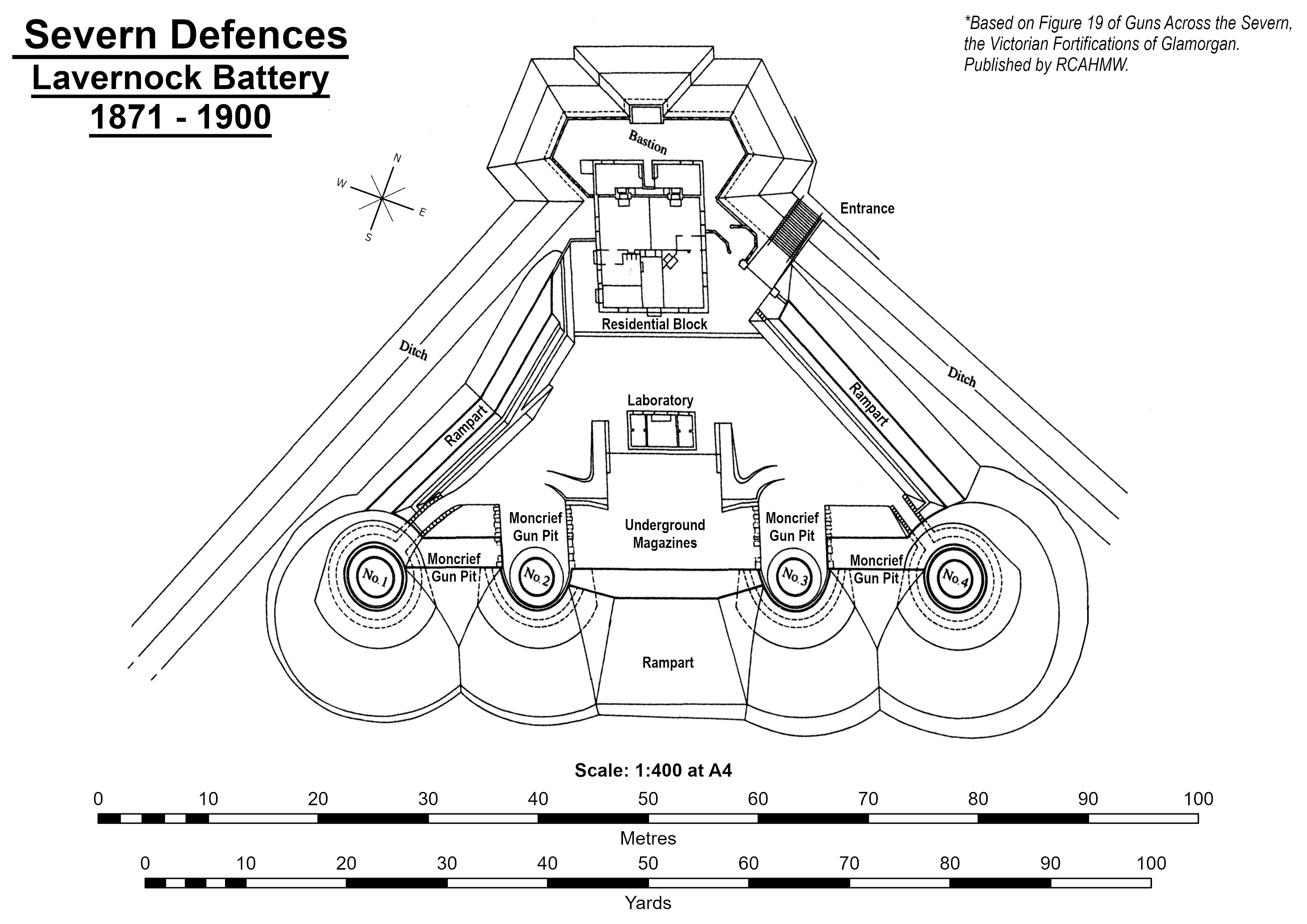
Lavernock Battery as originally constructed.

The battery was triangular shaped with four gun emplacements, a protective ditch, barracks, a laboratory, and a magazine. Most of the battery has been demolished and the ditch filled in; a swimming pool has been built over one of the magazines. What remains is included in a holiday caravan and chalet park.

The Second World War heavy anti-aircraft battery covers an area about 80 by 55 metres (87 by 60 yd) and also had four gun emplacements for 3.7-inch guns, each of which had some storage for ready-use ammunition. A larger magazine was positioned between two of the gun pits. All of the guns were controlled by a central director-rangefinder observation position. This battery is in good condition and has been listed as a Scheduled Ancient Monument.

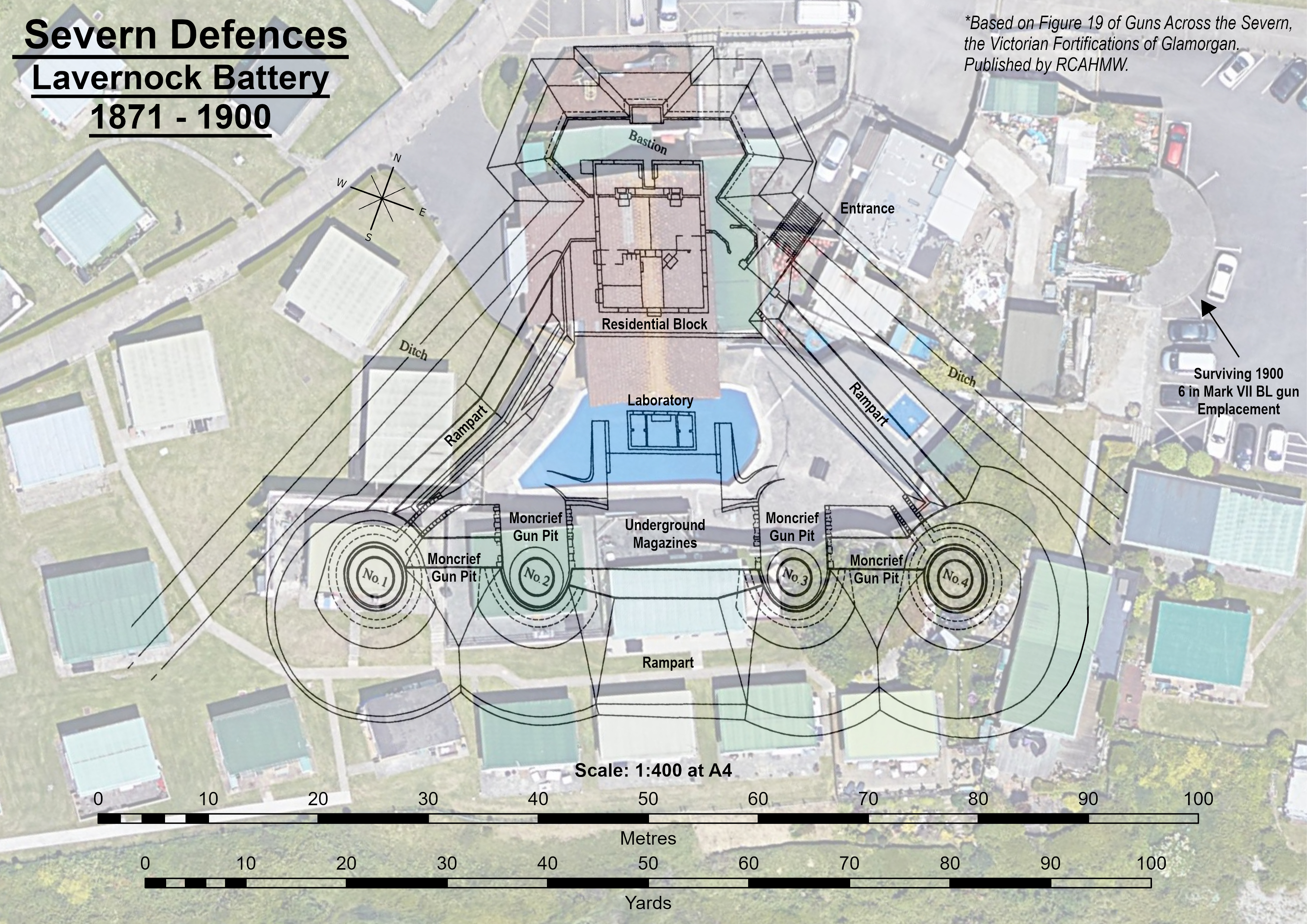
Battery compared to modern location of Marconi Holiday Village.
