= Brean Down =

Promontory in Somerset, England

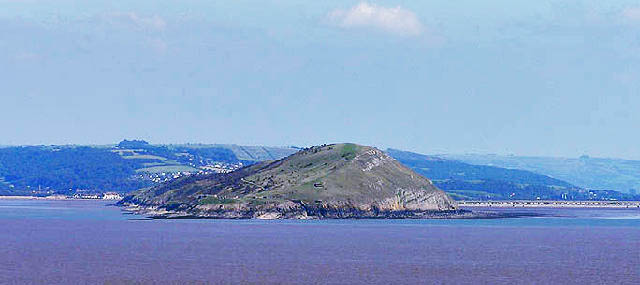
- Brean Down from Steep Holm

Highest point
- Elevation: 97 m (318 ft)
- Prominence: 91 m (299 ft)
- Coordinates: 51.3256°N 3.0290°W

Geography
- Location: Mendip Hills, England
- OS grid: ST284590
- Topo map: OS Landranger 182

Brean Down is a promontory off the coast of Somerset, England, standing 318 feet (97 m) high and extending 1 1/2 miles (2.5 kilometres) into the Bristol Channel at the eastern end of Bridgwater Bay between Weston-super-Mare and Burnham-on-Sea.

Made of Carboniferous Limestone, it is a continuation of the Mendip Hills. Two further continuations are the small islands of Steep Holm and Flat Holm. The cliffs on the northern and southern flanks of Brean Down have large quantities of fossils laid down in the marine deposits about 320–350 million years ago. The site has been occupied by humans since the late Bronze Age and includes the remains of a Romano-Celtic Temple. At the seaward end is Brean Down Fort which was built in 1865 and then re-armed in the Second World War.

Brean Down is now owned by the National Trust, and is rich in wildlife, history and archaeology. It is a Site of Special Scientific Interest due to both the geology and presence of nationally rare plants including the white rock-rose. It has also been scheduled as an ancient monument.

== Geology ==
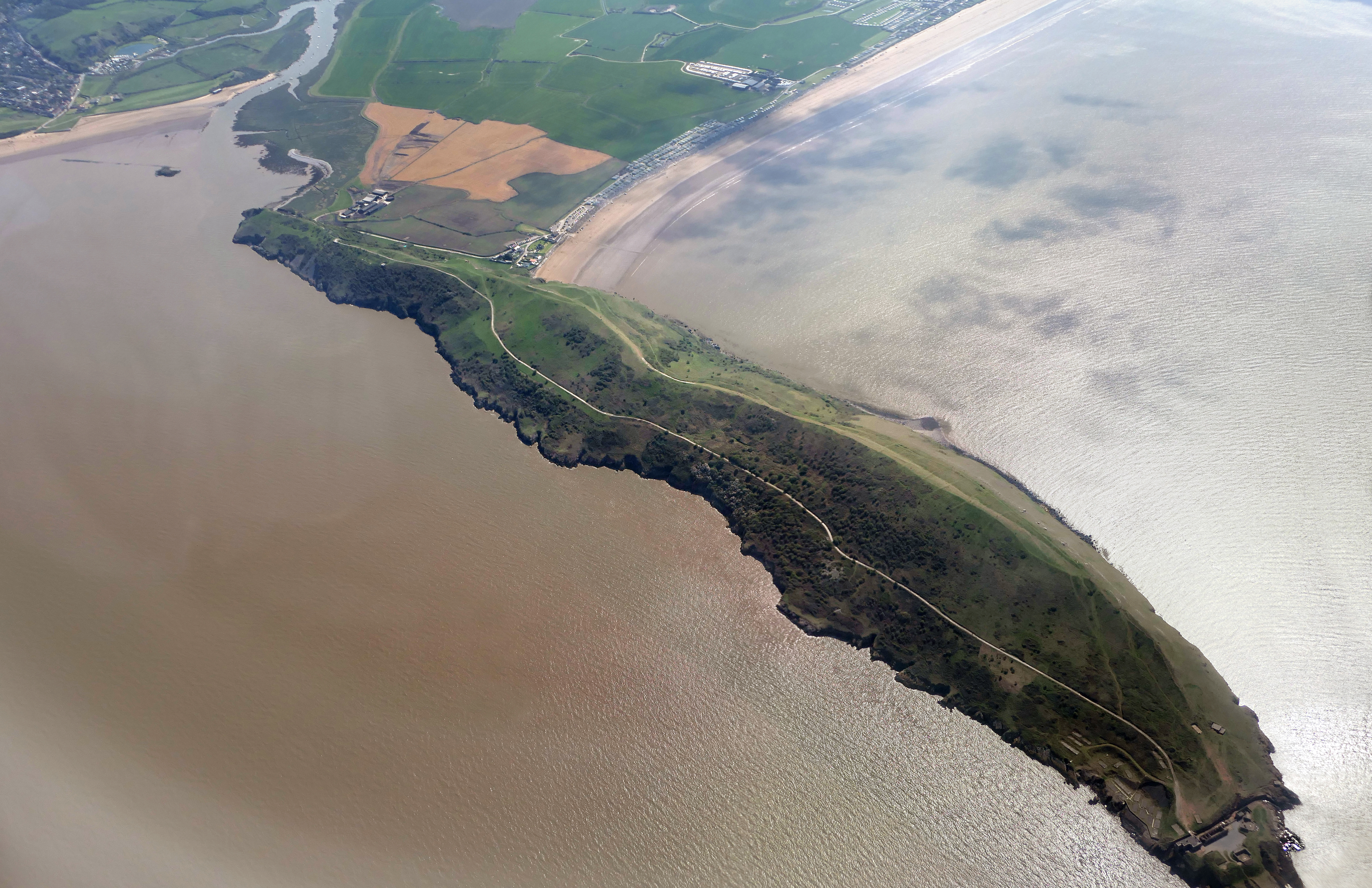
An aerial view of Brean Down

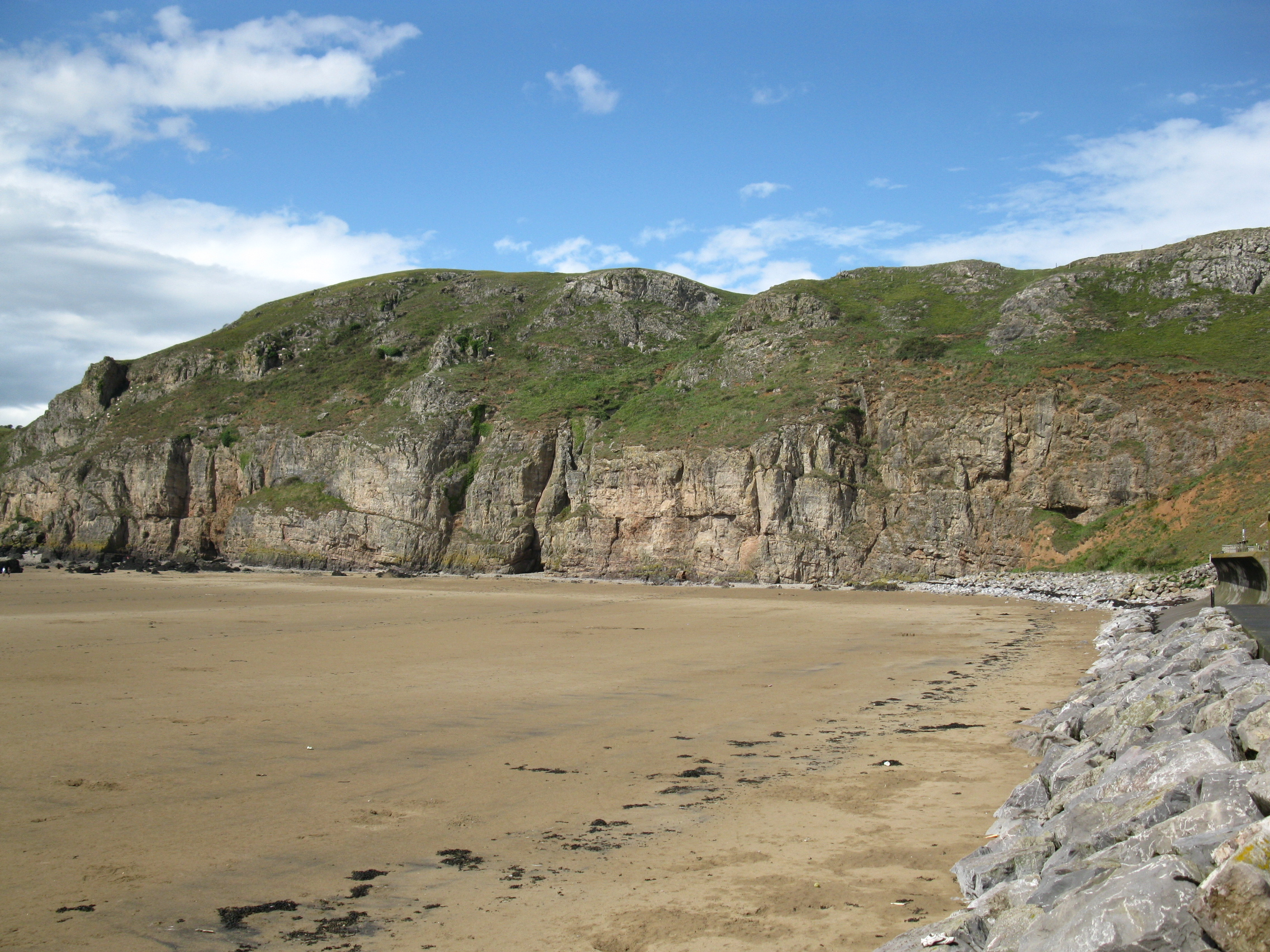
The cliffs on the south side showing fractures in the limestone.

The Mendip Hills, of which Brean Down forms the most westerly part, are the most southerly Carboniferous Limestone upland in Britain. These rock strata were laid down during the early Carboniferous period, about 320–350 million years ago. Subsequently, much of northwestern Europe underwent continental collision throughout the late Paleozoic era, culminating in the final phases of the Variscan orogeny near the end of the Carboniferous period, 300 million years ago. This tectonic activity produced a complex suite of mountain and hill ranges across what is now southern Ireland, south-western England, Brittany, and elsewhere in western Europe. As a result of the Variscan mountain-building, the Mendip area now comprises at least four anticlinal fold structures, with an east-west trend, each with a core of older Devonian sandstone and Silurian volcanic rocks. West of the main Mendip plateau the Carboniferous Limestone continues in Bleadon Hill and Brean Down, and on the islands of Steep Holm and Flat Holm.

Brean Down is just over two kilometres (1 1/4 mi) long and runs in an east-west direction near the mouth of the River Axe opposite Uphill Cliff. The flat area on the top of the peninsula may represent a raised beach laid down when the sea level was much higher than it is today, as the highest point of the promontory is approximately 97 metres (318 ft) above sea level. The cliffs on the north and south faces are rich in fossils that include corals, seashells and crinoids, which supports the theory of the marine deposition of the rocks. 13 separate layers have been identified in the 'sand cliff' on the south side, the lowest five dating to the millennia of the last glaciation.

== History ==
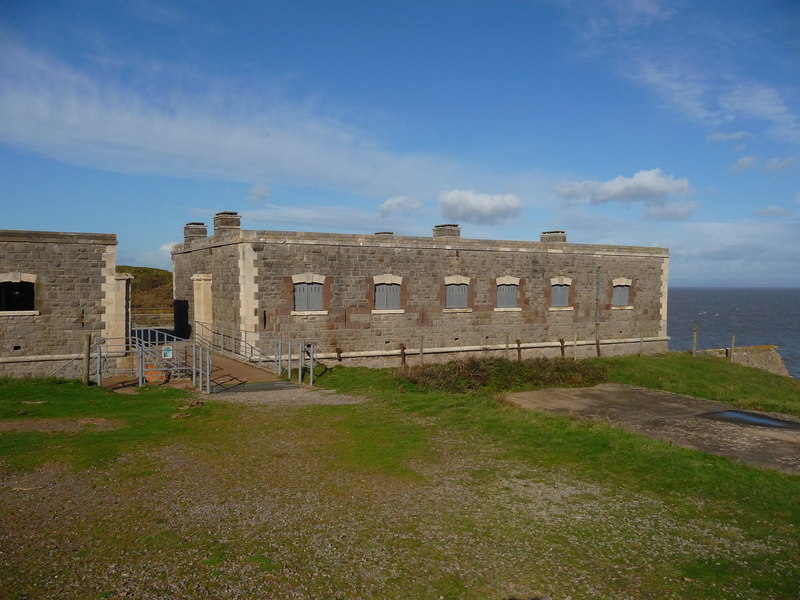
Brean Down Fort

Human occupation dates back to the Beaker culture of the late Bronze Age. There is also evidence of an Iron Age hill fort and prehistoric barrows and field systems. There is evidence of a shrine dating from pre-Roman times, which was re-established as a Romano-Celtic Temple in the mid-4th century. According to at least one source, it is extremely likely this was succeeded by a small late-4th-century Christian oratory. Several Roman finds including gold coins of Augustus, Nero, and Drusus, two silver denarii of Vespasian and a Roman carnelian ring were found at the site during quarrying.

Brean Down Fort was built on the headland between 1864 and 1871 on the recommendations of the 1859 Royal Commission. It was the most southerly of a chain of defences across the Bristol Channel, protecting the access to Bristol and Cardiff. Four acres of land at the end of Brean Down were requisitioned in 1862, with construction beginning in 1864 and completed in 1871.

In the 1860s plans were laid for a deep-water harbour on the northern shore of Brean Down. It was intended that this harbour would replace Bristol as a port on embarkation for transatlantic crossings and the export of minerals and agricultural produce from the Mendip Hills and the rest of Somerset. The foundation stones of the pier were laid, but the project was later abandoned after a large storm destroyed the foundations. In 1897, following wireless transmissions from Lavernock Point in Wales and Flat Holm, Guglielmo Marconi moved his equipment to Brean Down and set a new distance record of 14 kilometres (7 1/2 nautical miles) for wireless transmission over open sea. In 1912 Brean Down was leased by the Royal Society for the Protection of Birds as a bird sanctuary, acquiring the shooting rights to stop others shooting on the promontory.

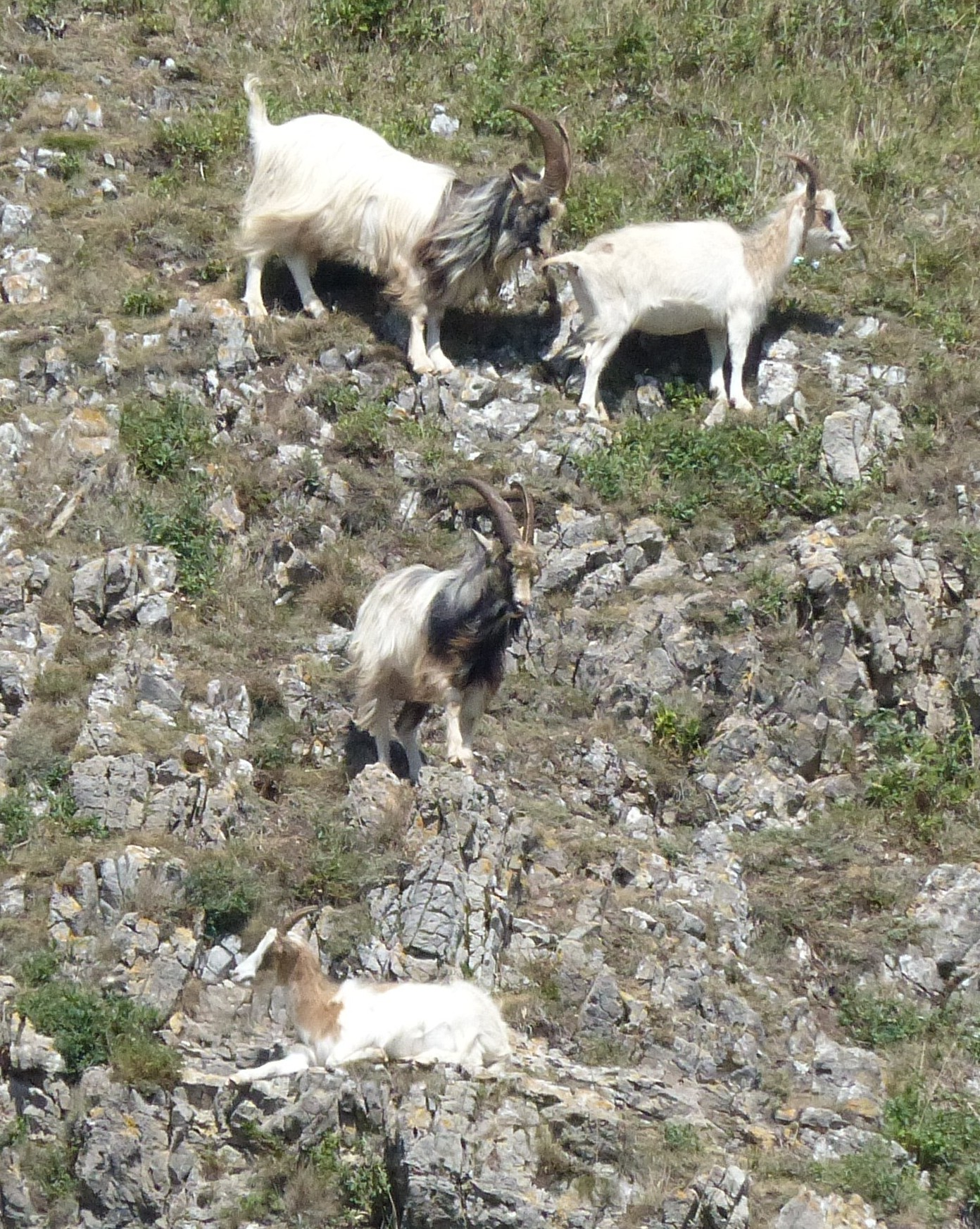
Wild goats roam free on the rocky slopes of Brean Down

On the outbreak of World War II, the fort was rearmed with two 6-inch (15-centimetre) ex-naval guns, and machine gun posts were built on the Down. Birnbeck Pier was taken over by the Admiralty in 1941 as an outpost of the Department of Miscellaneous Weapons Development (DMWD). It was commissioned as HMS Birnbeck, and was used for secret weapons development and storage with testing. The "Bouncing bomb" was tested at the Brean Down Fort on the opposite side of Weston Bay.

In 1954 the former Axbridge Rural District Council gave 59.685 hectares (147 31/64 acres) of the down to the National Trust to celebrate the Festival of Britain. The Major Aldermen and Burgesses of the Borough of Weston-Super Mare gave 1.494 hectares (3 11/16 acres) in 1963, and a further 1.371 hectares (3 25/64 acres) at Brean Down Cove was acquired from M.D. and M Matthews in 2000. After restoring the fort, which covers 1.606 hectares (3 31/32 acres), Sedgemoor District Council gave this to the trust as well in 2002.

Various proposals have been put forward to construct a Severn Barrage for tidal electricity production from Brean Down to Lavernock Point in south Wales. The proposals, which go back over 100 years, have never been successful so far, however Peter Hain and others are still working on further proposals and trying to persuade the government to fund either the barrage or tidal lagoons.

== Ecology ==
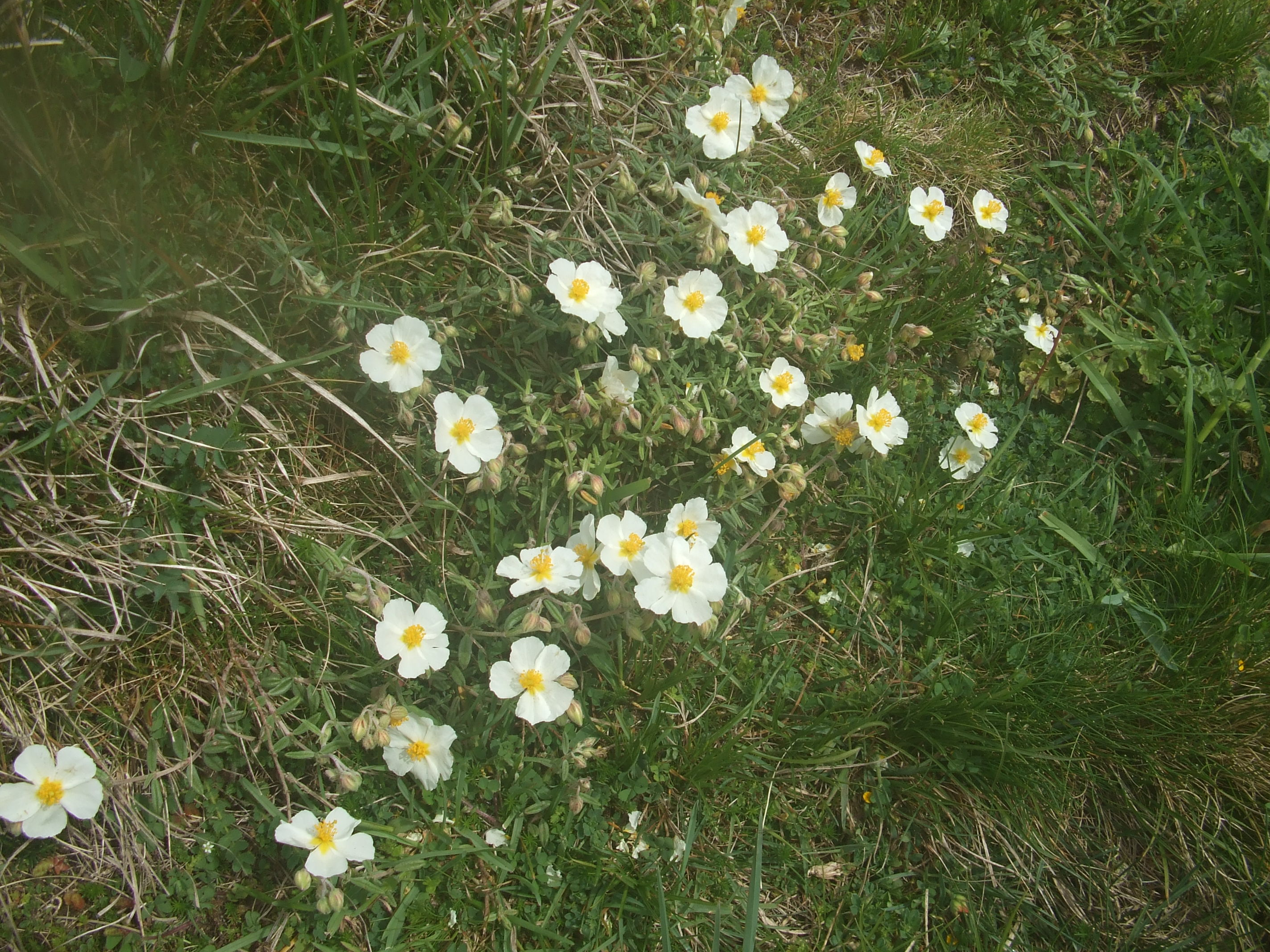
White rock-rose (Helianthemum apenninum) on the south cliff of Brean Down

In addition to the geological interest of the site, the range of plants growing on Brean Down has led to it being designated as a Site of Special Scientific Interest. The nationally rare white rock-rose (Helianthemum appenninum) is a common species at the site, occurring in abundance on the upper reaches of the grassy south-facing slopes. Some of the broomrapes growing here, which were originally thought to be oxtongue broomrape (Orobanche artemisiae-campestriae), are now no longer believed to be this species, but atypical specimens of ivy broomrape (Orobanche hederae). Other plants on the southern slopes include the Somerset hair grass, wild thyme, horseshoe vetch and birds-foot-trefoil. The northern side is dominated by bracken, bramble, privet, hawthorn, cowslips and bell heather.

The birds seen on Brean Down include peregrine falcon, jackdaw, kestrel, collared and stock doves, common whitethroat, common linnet, stonechat, dunnock, rock pipit and – in 2007 – Britain's first and only Atlantic yellow-nosed albatross was discovered in a garden nearby. There are also several species of butterfly, including chalkhill blue, dark green fritillary, meadow brown, marbled white, small heath, and common blue.

== See also ==
- List of National Trust properties in Somerset

== Bibliography ==
- Adkins, Lesley and Roy (1992). A field Guide to Somerset Archeology. Stanbridge: Dovecote press. ISBN 0-946159-94-7.
- ApSimon, A.M. (1958). "The Roman temple on Brean Down, Somerset: An Interim Report on the 1957 Excavations" (PDF). UBSS Proceedings. 8 (2): 106–109.
- ApSimon, A.M. (1965). "The Roman Temple on Brean Down, Somerset" (PDF). UBSS Proceedings. 10 (3): 195–258.
- Aston, Mick; Burrow, Ian (1991). The Archaeology of Somerset. Taunton: Somerset County Council. ISBN 978-0-86183-028-2.
- Atthill, Robin (1976). Mendip: A New Study. David & Charles. ISBN 978-0-7153-7297-5.
- Coysh, A.W.; Mason, E.J.; Waite, V. (1977). The Mendips. London: Robert Hale Ltd. ISBN 0-7091-6426-2.
- Dunning, Robert (2003). A History of Somerset. Tiverton: Somerset Books. ISBN 0-86183-476-3.
- Evans, Roger (2004). Somerset tales of mystery and murder. Newbury: Countryside Books. ISBN 978-1-85306-863-8.
- Faulkner, T.J. (1989). "The early Carboniferous (Courceyan) Middle Hope volcanics of Weston-super-Mare: development and demise of an offshore volcanic high". Proceedings of the Geologists' Association. 100 (1): 93–106. doi:10.1016/S0016-7878(89)80068-9.
- Garratt, G.R.M. (1994). The Early History of Radio: From Faraday to Marconi. IET. ISBN 978-0-85296-845-1.
- Goldberg, Paul (2009). Practical and Theoretical Geoarchaeology. John Wiley & Sons. ISBN 978-1-4443-1225-6.
- Green, Paul R.; Green, Ian P.; Crouch, Geralidine R. (1997). The Atlas Flora of Somerset. P.R. Green, I.P. Green, and G.A. Crouch. ISBN 978-0-9531324-0-9.
- Haslett, Simon K. (2010). Somerset Landscapes: Geology and Landforms. Usk: Blackbarn Books. ISBN 978-1-4564-1631-7.
- Kellaway, G. A.; Welch, F. B. A. (1948). Bristol and Gloucester District. British Regional Geology (Second ed.). London: HMSO for Natural Environment Research Council, Institute of Geological Sciences, Geographical Survey and Museum. ISBN 0-11-880064-7.
- Quinn, Tom (2008). Hidden Britain. New Holland Publishers. ISBN 978-1-84773-129-6.
- Twist, Colin (2001). Rare Plants in Great Britain – a site guide. Colin Twist.
- van der Bijl, Nicholas (2000). Brean Down Fort: Its History and the Defences of the Bristol Channel. Cossington: Hawk Editions. ISBN 978-0-9529081-7-3.
