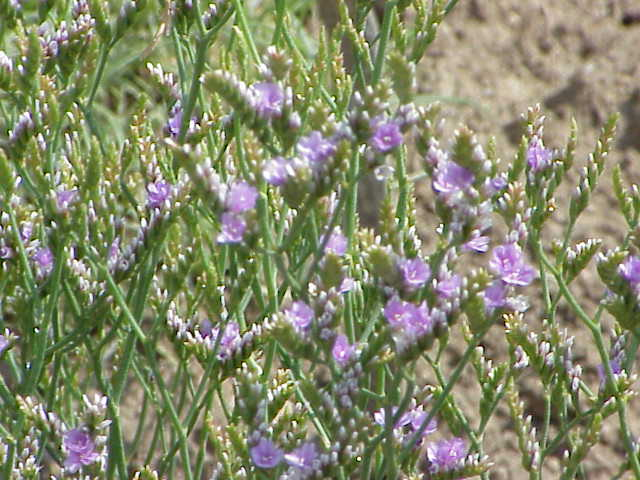

Scientific classification
- Kingdom: Plantae
- Clade: Tracheophytes
- Clade: Angiosperms
- Clade: Eudicots
- Order: Caryophyllales
- Family: Plumbaginaceae
- Genus: Limonium
- Species: L. binervosum

Binomial name
- Limonium binervosum (G.E.Sm.) C.E.Salmon

= Limonium binervosum =

Rock sea-lavender

Species of flowering plant

Limonium binervosum, commonly known as rock sea-lavender, is an aggregate species in the family Plumbaginaceae.

Despite the common name, rock sea-lavender is not related to the lavenders or to rosemary but is a perennial herb with small violet-blue flowers with five petals in clusters.

Eight rock sea-lavenders are endemic to Britain and Guernsey and the taxonomy was reviewed in 1986 to include a range of subspecies.

Growing 10–70 cm tall from a rhizome, Limonium binervosum flourishes in saline soils, so are therefore common near the western coasts and in salt marshes, and also on saline, gypsum and alkaline soils such as found on Flat Holm island in Wales, UK

== Subspecies ==
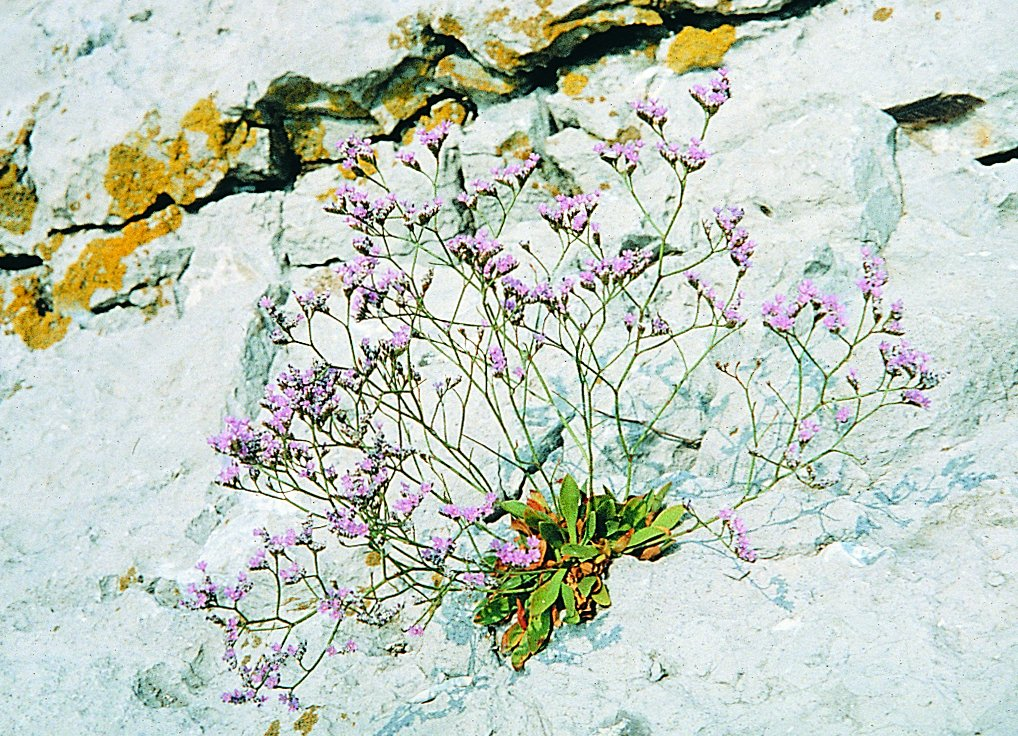
Limonium binervosum on Flat Holm island UK

- Limonium binervosum subsp. anglicum
- Limonium binervosum subsp. cantianum
- Limonium binervosum subsp. saxonicum
- Limonium britanicum subsp. britanicum
- Limonium britanicum subsp. combense
- Limonium binervosum subsp. pseudotranswallianum
- Limonium dodartiforme
- Limonium loganicum
- Limonium recurvum
