= The Wolves (Bristol Channel) =

Rocky islets off Wales in Bristol Channel

Coordinates: 51°23′01″N 3°08′39″W

The Wolves are three small rocky islets just over a mile northwest of the island of Flat Holm in the Bristol Channel. They measure approximately 25 metres by 20 metres and have been responsible for the wrecking of at least two ships:

- 1817 — the William & Mary struck one of the islets and sank within 15 minutes. 54 passengers were lost, 50 of whom were recovered and buried on Flat Holm. There were 15 survivors.
- 1917 — the Swansea Packet, sank with all 60 passengers and crew.
