= List of Palmerston Forts along the Bristol Channel =

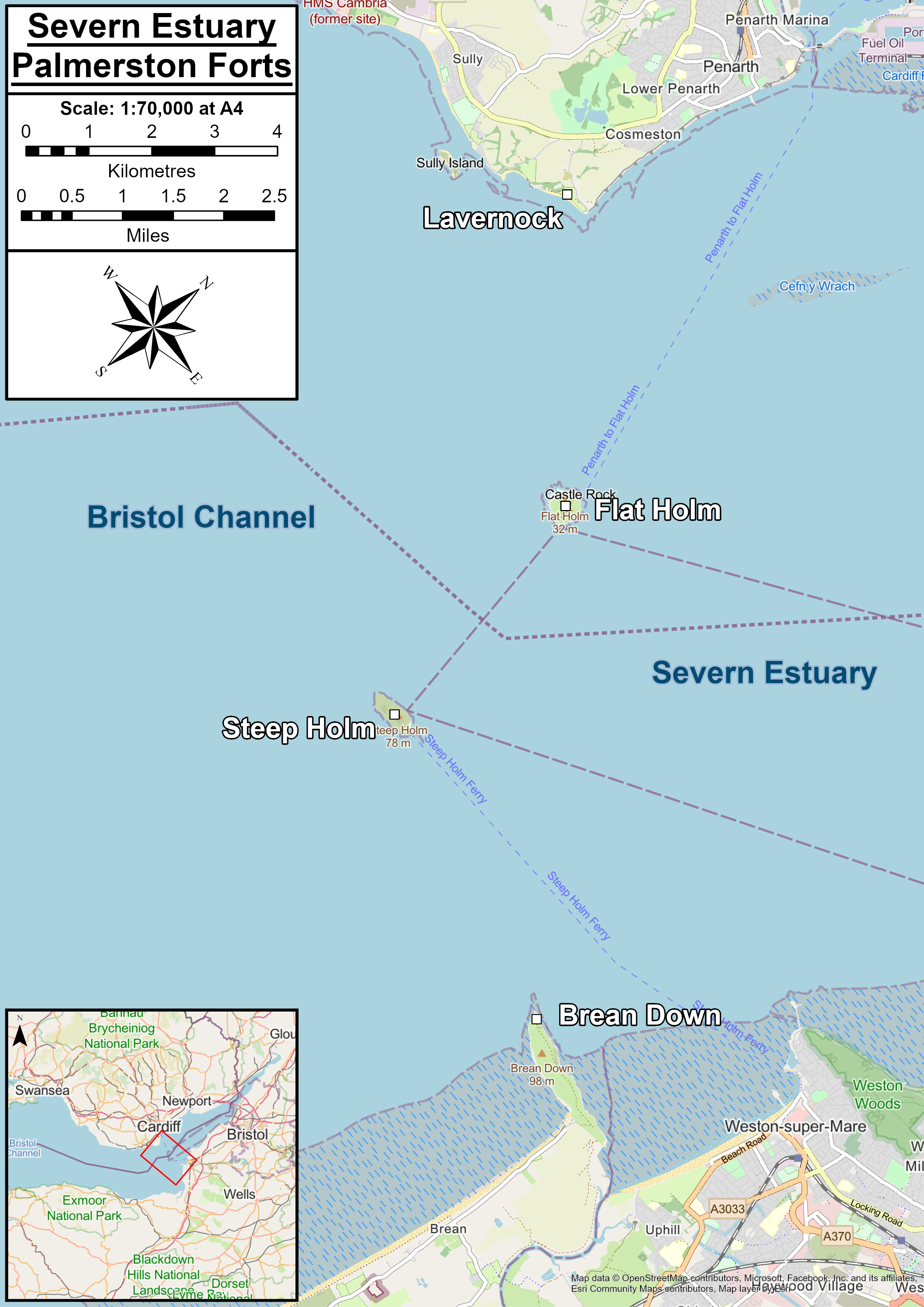
Four of the forts of the Severn Defences, forming a line dividing the channel into three shipping lanes. From Lavernock near Penarth to Brean Down near Weston-super-Mare

The Palmerston Forts along the Bristol Channel include:

Severn Estuary Line of Defences:

- Lavernock Battery, Penarth
- Flat Holm Battery, Flat Holm
- Steep Holm Battery, Steep Holm
- Brean Down Fort, Weston-super-Mare

Others:

- Nell's Point Battery, Barry Island
- Mumbles Head, Swansea Bay
- St Catherine's Fort, Tenby
