= Brean Down Fort =

19th-century military fortification in Somerset, England

- Somerset, England
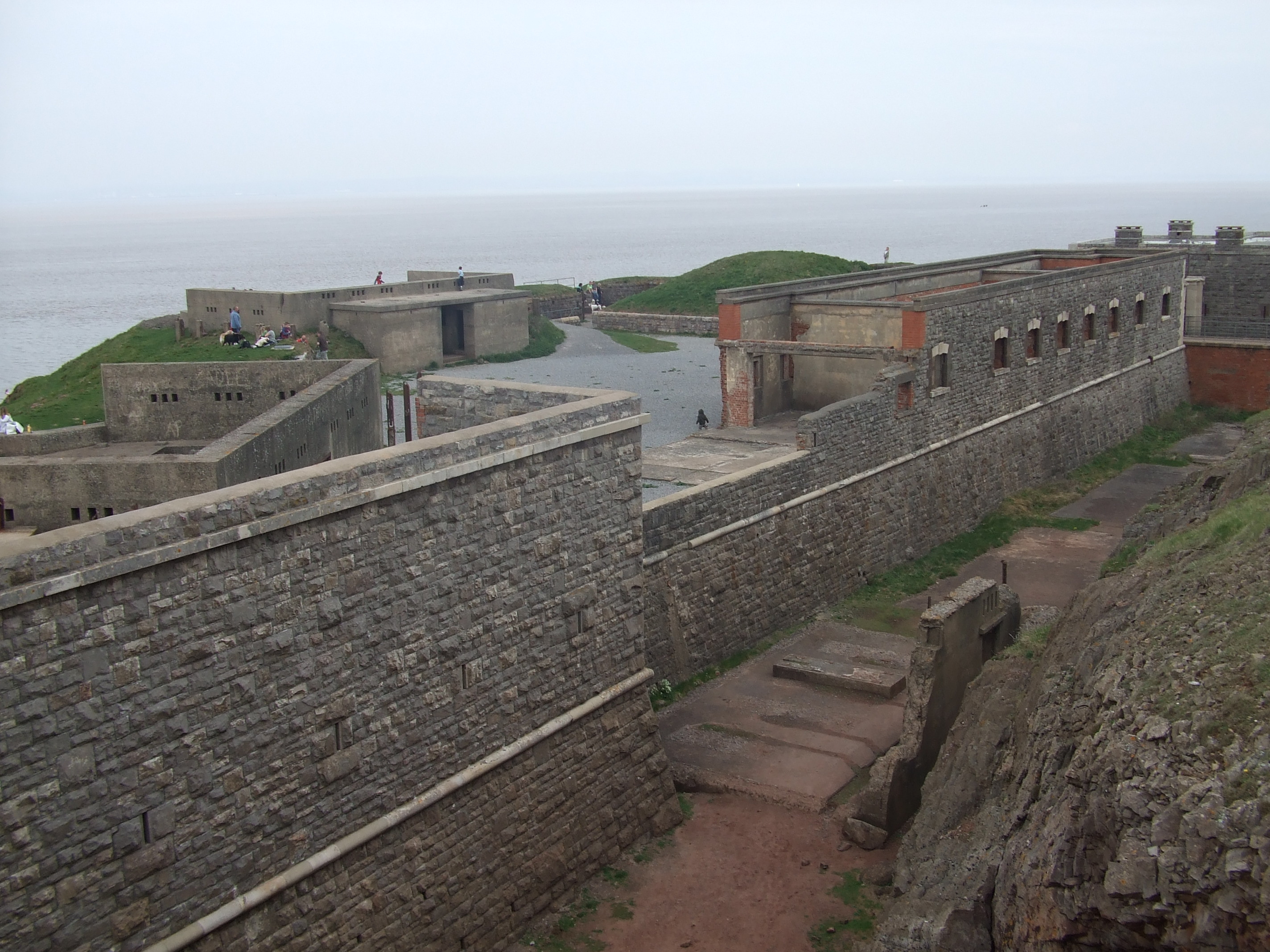

Site information
- Owner: National Trust
- Open to the public: The site remains unlocked at all times, with volunteers manning buildings on summer weekends and Mon, Wed, Fri in summer school holidays

Location
- Location within Somerset
- Coordinates: 51°19′38.03″N 3°02′00.08″W

Site history
- Built: 1864–1871 rearmed in World War II
- In use: 1871–1901, 1940–1945

Garrison information
- Garrison: Coast Brigade, Royal Artillery

Brean Down Fort was a Victorian naval fortification designed to protect the Bristol Channel. It was built 60 feet (18 m) above sea level on the headland at Brean Down, 9 miles (14 km) south of Weston-super-Mare, Somerset, England.

The site has a long history because of its prominent position. The earliest recorded settlement is from the Early to Middle Bronze Age.

The current buildings were constructed in the 1860s as one of the Palmerston Forts to provide protection to the ports of the Bristol Channel, and were decommissioned in 1901. During World War II the site was rearmed and used for experimental weapons testing.

The site has been owned by the National Trust since 2002, following a £431,000 renovation project, as part of its Brean Down property and is open to the public.

The fort was used as a location for filming of the second episode, "Warriors", of the BBC television drama Bonekickers.

The fort was also used for exterior scenes of the Royal Marines attack on the villains base on Cragfest Island in episode six of 1978 HTV series The Doombolt Chase.

== Bronze Age to Roman ==
The earliest record settlement is from the Early to Middle Bronze Age. It is now on an exposed cliff as the land has been eroded by the sea. Bronze Age artefacts from the site include pottery and jewellery. Most of the finds are now in the Museum of Somerset in Taunton. The presence of a probable roundhouse has also been detected.

The site has also produced Roman gold and silver coins of the emperors Augustus, Nero, Drusus and Vespasian and a cornelian ring.

== Palmerston Fort ==
Brean Down Fort forms part of a line of defences, known as Palmerston Forts, built across the channel to protect the approaches to Bristol and Cardiff. It was fortified following a visit by Queen Victoria and Prince Albert to France, where they had been concerned at the strength of the French Navy. The Royal Commission on the Defence of the United Kingdom, under direction of Lord Palmerston, recommended fortification of the coast. Brean Down Fort formed part of a strategic coastal defence system covering the channel between the mainland and the islands of Steep Holm and Flat Holm.

Four acres of land at the end of Brean Down were requisitioned in 1862, with construction beginning in 1864 and completed in 1871.

The fort was originally armed with seven 7-inch rifled muzzle-loading guns, which were among the last of this type to be made at the Woolwich Gun Foundry. These were sited at three main gun positions, including W battery containing two guns on 'C' pivots (rotating around a reused Georgian cannon set upright in the ground). Each gun weighed 7 tons and had a 30-pound (14 kg) charge of gunpowder able to fire a 112-pound (51 kg) Palliser shot at 1,560 feet (475 m) per second. This could pierce 8 inches (20 cm) of armour at 1,000 yards (910 m). It was proposed to replace the 7-inch guns with larger 9-inch versions in 1888 but this was never put into action. It had a large, underground, main gunpowder magazine, 15 by 18 feet (4.6 by 5.5 m) and 20 feet (6.1 m) high. The fort was staffed by 50 officers and men of the Coast Brigade, Royal Artillery, but no shots were ever fired in action.

In 1897, following wireless transmissions from Lavernock Point in Wales and Flat Holm, Guglielmo Marconi moved his equipment to Brean Down and set a new distance record of 14 kilometres (8.7 mi) for wireless transmission over open sea. The end of the fort's active service came at 5 a.m. on 6 July 1900 when the No. 3 magazine which held 3 tons (3 tonnes) of gunpowder exploded. An inquiry found that Gunner Haines had fired a ball cartridge down a ventilator shaft causing the explosion, after being put on a charge for returning late to barracks, however this explanation has been challenged. The wall separating the fort from the moat on the south west corner was demolished and wreckage thrown up to 200 yards (183 m). No one knew why the gunner had blown up the fort, but it has been speculated that it was an act of suicide. The cannons were hauled away by traction engines.

It was then used as a café, owned by the Hillman family from at least 1907 until sold in 1936 to the 'bird sanctuary people'.

== World War II ==
On the outbreak of World War II the fort was rearmed with two six-inch ex-naval guns and two searchlights as a coastal artillery battery. The site was also used as a test launch site for rockets and experimental weapons.

Two gun positions were built to mount the ex-naval guns in their turrets. These were later protected with a "plastic" anti-aircraft roof. One position was built over the ruins of the old west battery and the other partly obscures the north west battery. The barrack blocks were converted and the windows partly blocked to reduce the effects of blast. Several other associated structures, including searchlight batteries for illuminating seaborne targets, a command post and the barracks for the garrison were built outside the original Palmeston fort.

The site was manned by 365 and 366 Coast Batteries of 571st Coast Regiment, Royal Artillery, formed from Brean Down Fire Control in December 1941 and disbanded in April 1944.

Several experimental weapons were trialled at Brean, by the Admiralty's Directorate of Miscellaneous Weapons Development, based at HMS Birnbeck. The only evidence being a short length of launching rail, designed to launch a bouncing bomb.

Some of the better known weapons trialled were the seaborne bouncing bomb designed specifically to bounce to a target such as across water to avoid torpedo nets, anti-submarine missile AMUCK and the expendable acoustic emitter (designed to confuse noise-seeking torpedoes).

== Gallery ==
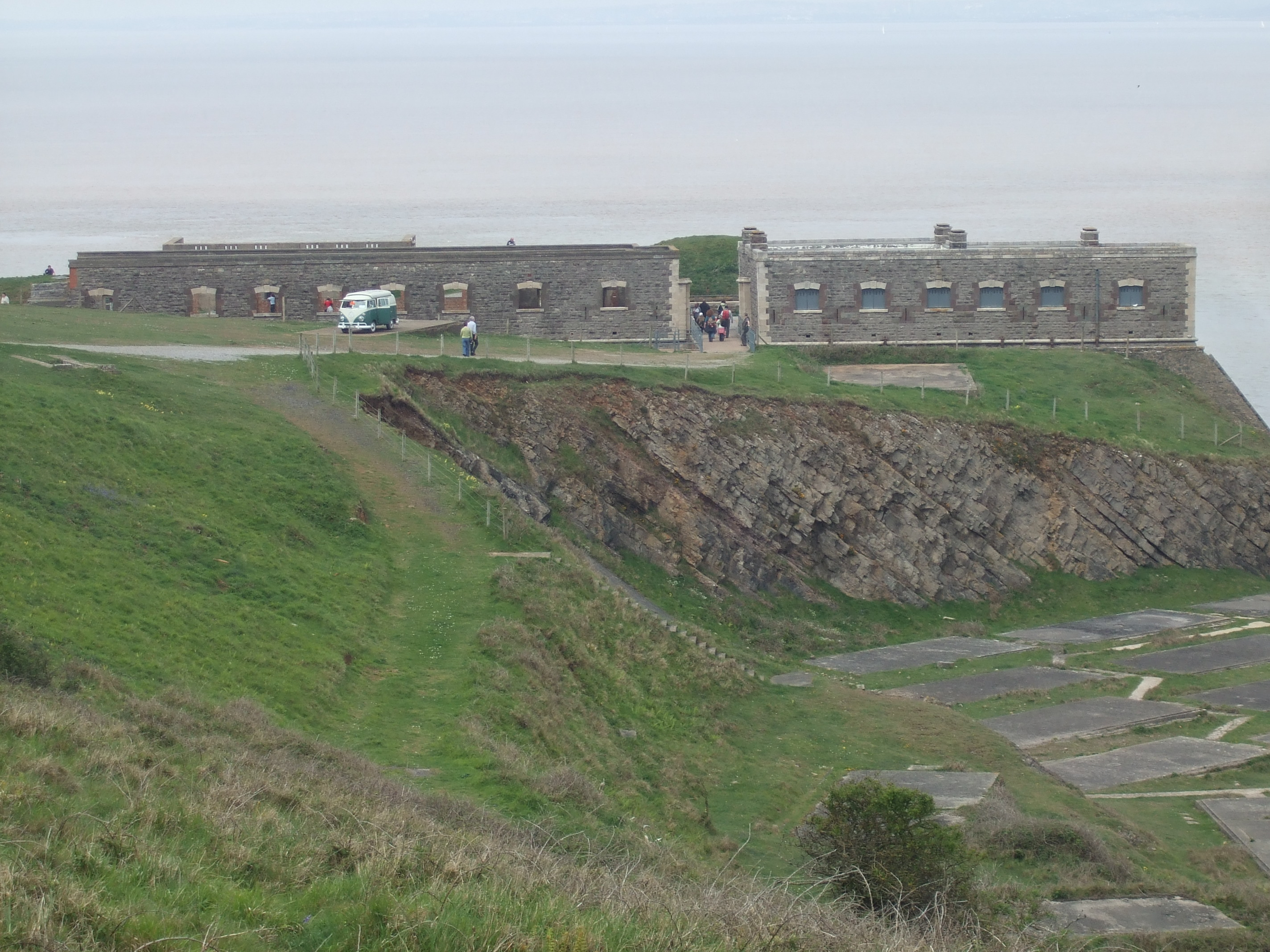
The fort seen from the north path

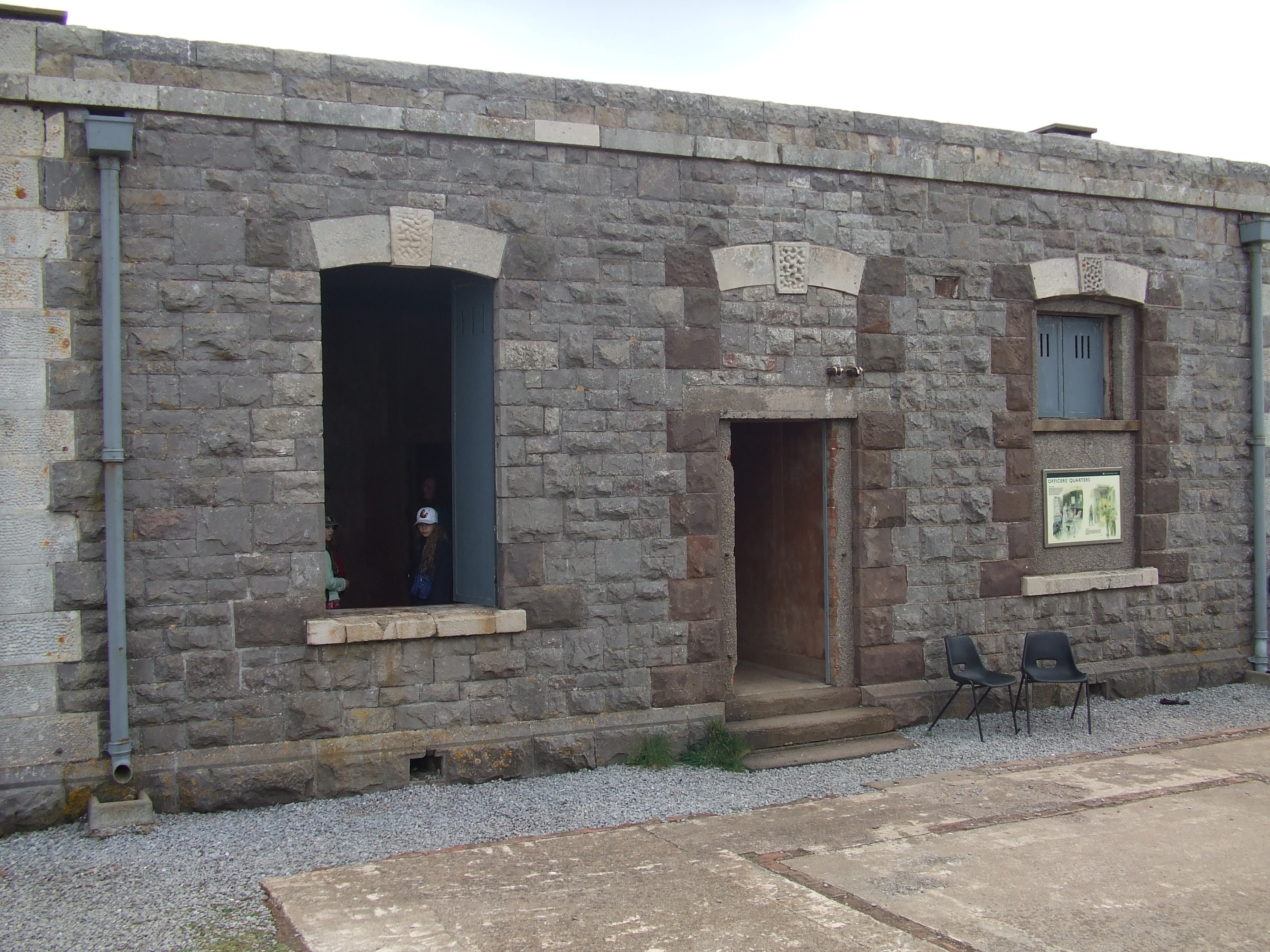
Officers quarters

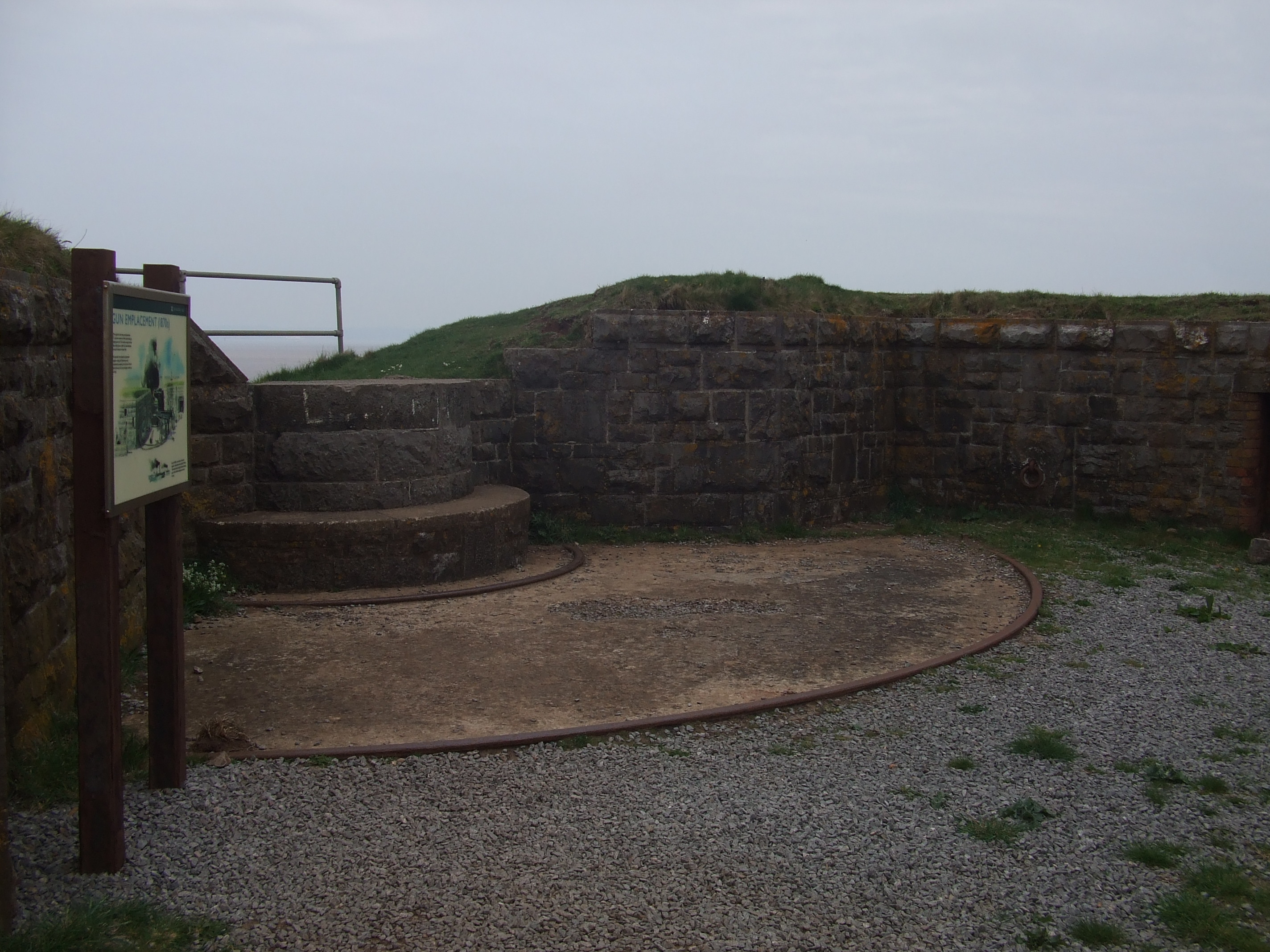
Gun emplacement

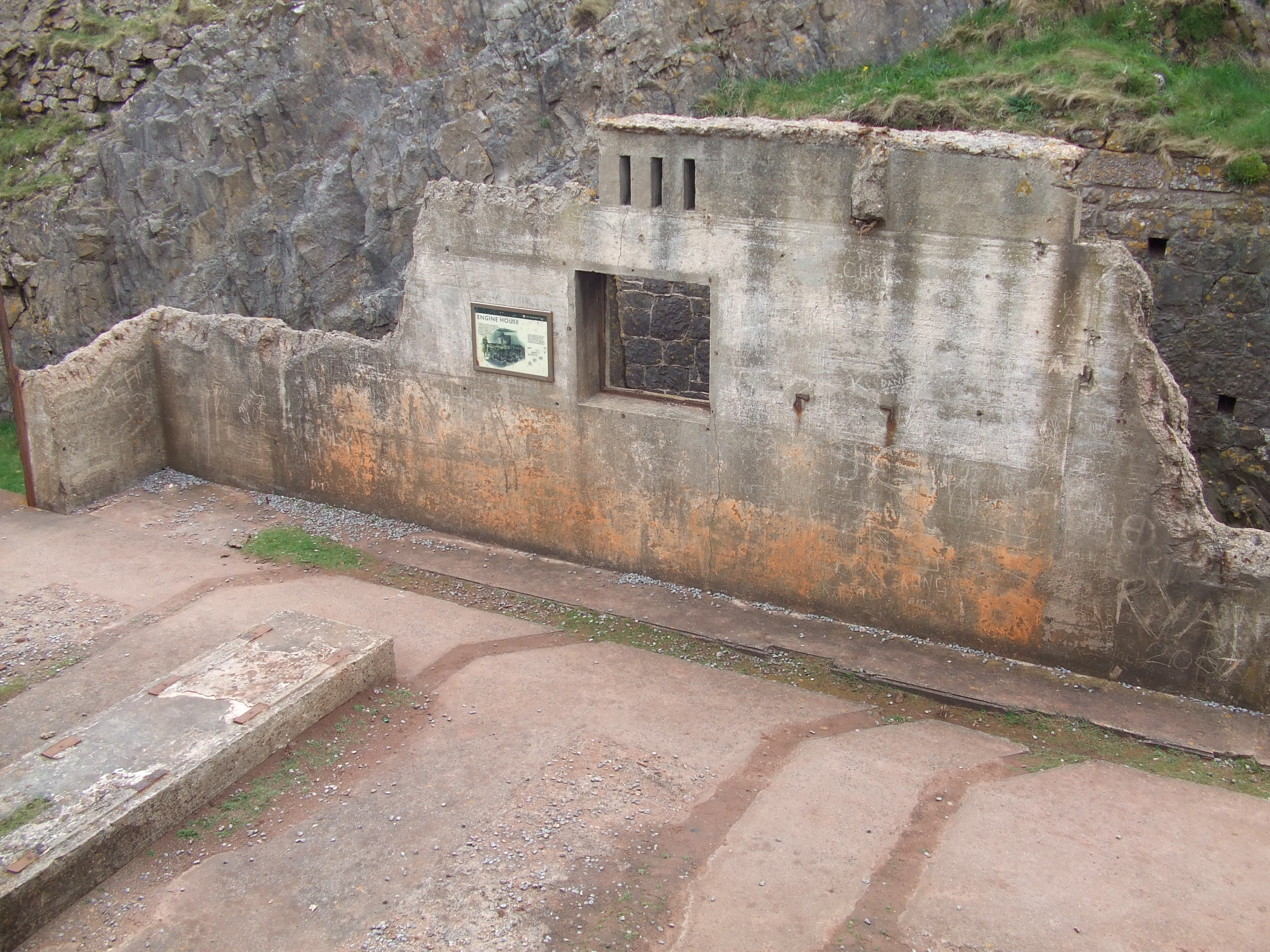
Engine House

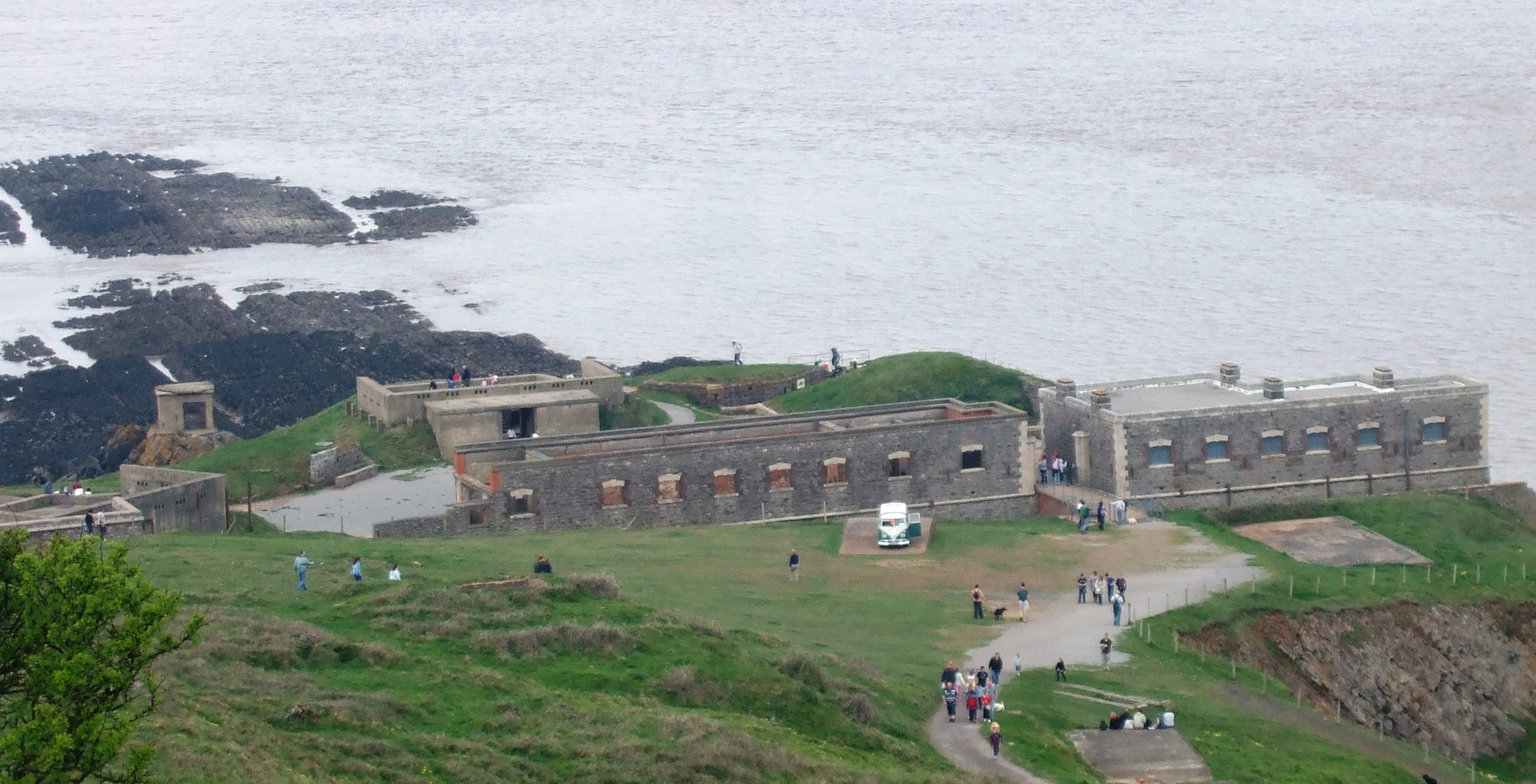
The fort from the south path

== See also ==
- List of hillforts and ancient settlements in Somerset
