= Flat Holm =

Welsh island in the Bristol Channel

Native name: Ynys Echni (Welsh)
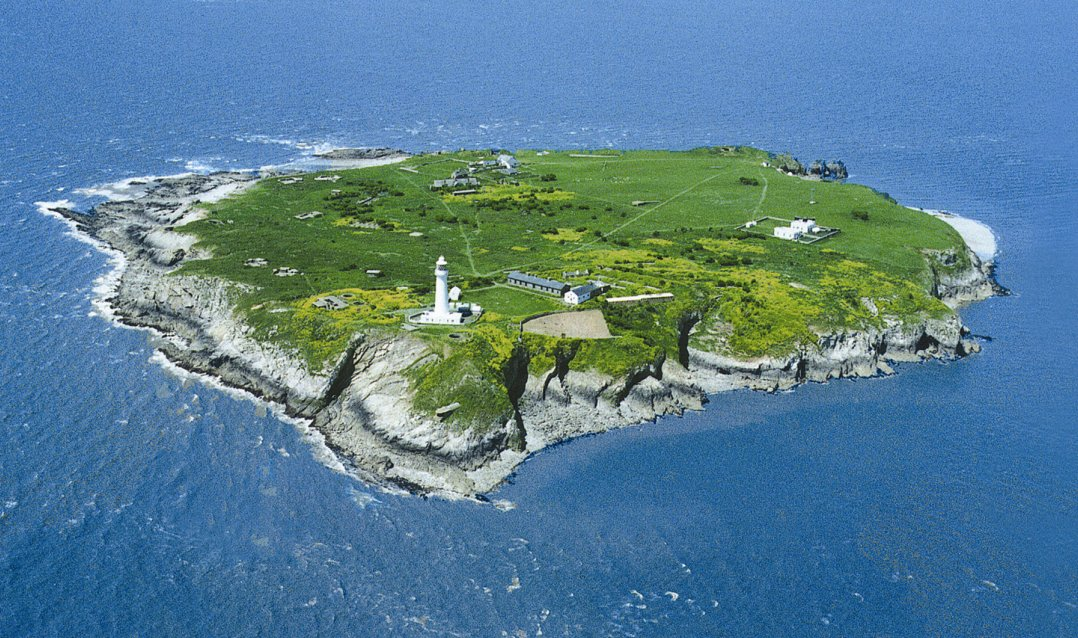
- Flat Holm in April 2008

Geography
- Location: Bristol Channel
- Coordinates: 51°22′37″N 3°07′19″W
- Area: 0.35 km^{2} (0.14 sq mi)
- Length: 0.63 km (0.391 mi)
- Width: 0.61 km (0.379 mi)
- Highest elevation: 32 m (105 ft)

Administration
- Wales
- City and County: Cardiff
- Community: Butetown
- Capital city: Cardiff

Demographics
- Population: 1

Additional information
- Official website: www.flatholmisland.com

Flat Holm (Welsh: Ynys Echni) is a Welsh island lying in the Bristol Channel approximately 6 km (4 mi) from Lavernock Point in the Vale of Glamorgan. It includes the most southerly point of Wales.

The island has a long history of occupation, dating at least from the Bronze Age. Religious uses include visits by disciples of Saint Cadoc in the 5th–6th century AD, and in 1835 it was the site of the foundation of the Bristol Channel Mission, which later became the Mission to Seafarers. A sanatorium for cholera patients was built in 1896 as the isolation hospital for the port of Cardiff. Guglielmo Marconi transmitted the first Wireless signals over open sea from Flat Holm to Lavernock. Because of frequent shipwrecks, a lighthouse was built on the island, which was replaced by a Trinity House lighthouse in 1737. Because of its strategic position on the approaches to Bristol and Cardiff a series of gun emplacements, known as Flat Holm Battery, were built in the 1860s as part of a line of defences, known as Palmerston Forts. On the outbreak of World War II, the island was rearmed.

It forms part of the City and County of Cardiff and is now managed by Cardiff Council's Flat Holm Project Team and designated as a Local Nature Reserve, Site of Special Scientific Interest and a Special Protection Area, because of the maritime grassland and rare plants such as rock sea-lavender (Limonium binervosum) and wild leek (Allium ampeloprasum). The island also has significant breeding colonies of lesser black-backed gulls (Larus fuscus), herring gulls (Larus argentatus) and great black-backed gulls (Larus marinus). It is also home to slow worms (Anguis fragilis) with larger than usual blue markings.

== Geology ==
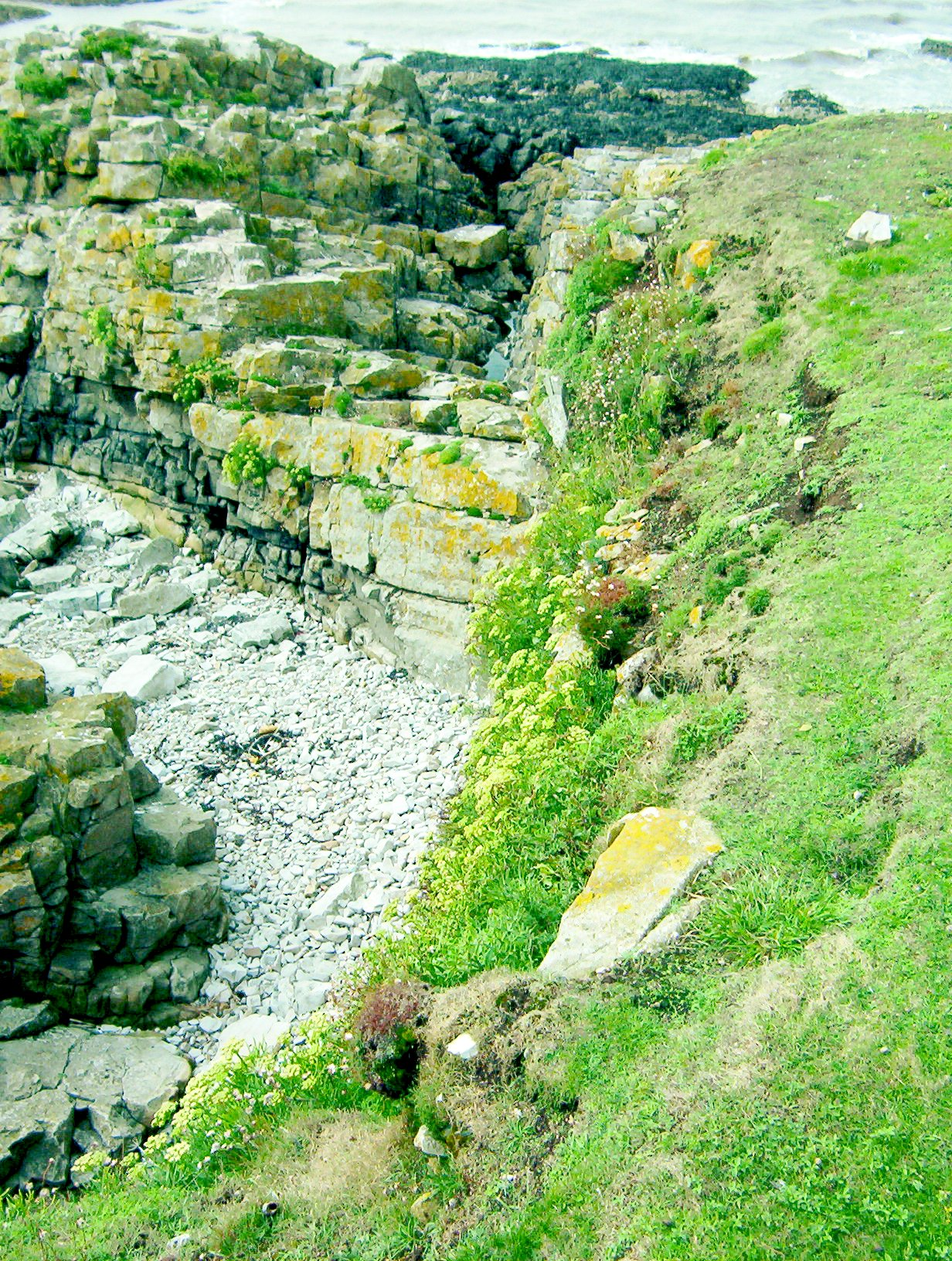
Flat Holm geology

During much of the most recent ice ages, from 1.8 million years ago, the sea level in the Severn Estuary was some 50 m (160 ft) below the current level and Flat Holm was joined to the Somerset coast as an extremity of the Mendip Hills. Sometime since the start of the Mesolithic period, 15,000 years ago, the ice sheets retreated, and the flat plains surrounding the river estuary flooded; the hilltops of Mendip Hills became the islands of Flat Holm and Steep Holm.

The Carboniferous Limestone of which Flat Holm and neighbouring Steep Holm are composed forms a part of a wider Mesozoic basin extending from the Bristol and Mendip area westwards beneath the mouth of the Severn to South Wales, outcropping to the west at Sully Island and Barry, Wales. Part of the island is designated a Geological Conservation Review (GCR) Site and is a recognised Site of Special Scientific Interest (SSSI). The GCR and SSSI interest lies along the south-western shoreline from the north west point to Lighthouse Point where a wave cut portion of the limestone displays large fossil "ripple marks".

During the Ice Age, the island was covered by glacier ice on several occasions. There are abundant erratic pebbles on the beaches, mostly from Pembrokeshire, indicating that the ice that covered the island was that of the Irish Sea Ice Stream, travelling from west to east up the Bristol Channel. There are also larger erratics, including one spectacular pink granite boulder on a rocky foreshore near the farmhouse.

There are argentiferous (i.e. silver-bearing) galena deposits on Flat Holm; the pits and mounds visible on the surface of the island are a result of trial borings. A dispute over lead mining rights in the 1780s ended with John Stuart, Lord Mount Stuart making an official complaint that the lighthouse keeper was using the coals intended for the lighthouse for processing lead. Mining for lead was not profitable, however, and the works were abandoned. Red marl from the Triassic Period fills joints in the Carboniferous Limestone showing evidence of karstic (cave forming) processes during this period. Caves on the western and north-eastern sides of the island were used during the years of smuggling.

== History ==
=== Bronze Age ===
The first traces of human habitation of the island are from the late Bronze Age, 900 to 700 BC. A bronze axe head was discovered on the island in 1988, between the island's farmhouse and West Beach.

=== Sub-Roman ===
In the sub-Roman period of the 5th-6th century AD, it became a retreat for Saint Cadoc, who lived on the island as a hermit for seven years. His friend, Saint Gildas born in the Kingdom of Strathclyde but educated at the College of Theodosius (Cor Tewdws) in the Kingdom of Gwent, lived at the same time on nearby Steep Holm, and the two sometimes met up for prayers. Gildas eventually left the island to become Abbot of Glastonbury.

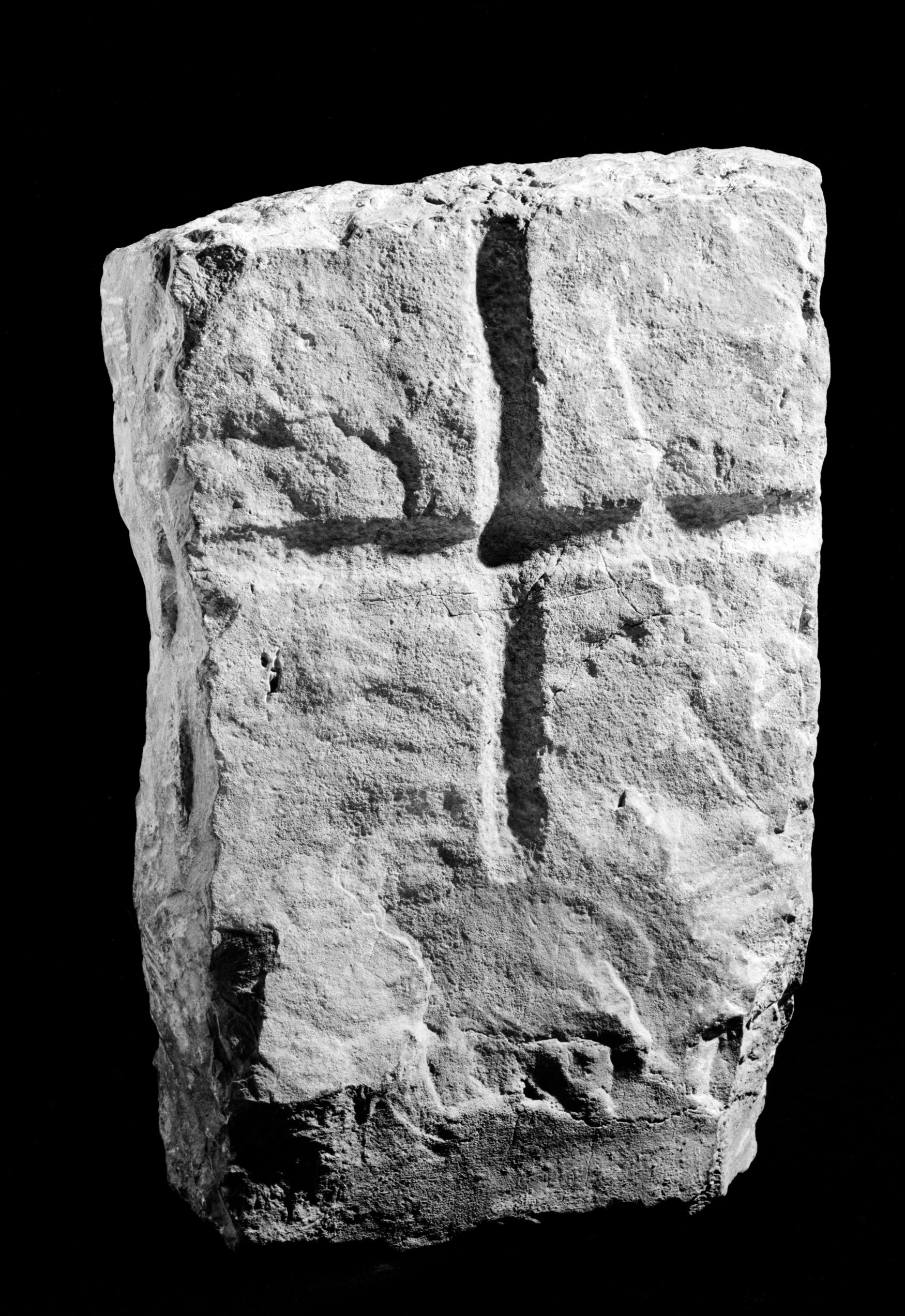
Part of a medieval grave slab 42 cm (17 in) by 26 cm (10 in) and 11 cm (4 in) thick, now in the National Museum of Wales

In June 1815, a Dr Thomas Turner visited Flat Holm in a small boat and was stranded for a week due to high winds. He discovered two Christian graves located close together in a field 23 m (75 ft) northeast of the island's present farmhouse; one grave had been opened and contained a male skeleton. The open grave's headstone was made of purbeck marble and engraved with a Celtic cross, but had since broken in two. A second disturbed grave, also marked with a headstone, was found to the southeast and contained a coffin constructed with iron bolts. Inside the coffin were two skeletons which had been doused in lime, indicating that the occupants had probably died from a contagious disease.

=== Middle Ages ===
Anglo-Saxons called the island Bradanreolice. Reolice derives from an Irish word meaning churchyard or graveyard, alluding to the belief that the island had religious significance as a place of burial to people at the time. However, the island's current English name of "Holm" comes from the Old Norse meaning "island in an estuary". Records indicate that a Viking fleet from the south of Brittany led by two earls, Ottir (Oter) and Hroald (possibly Ottir's king Ragnall), took refuge on the island following their defeat by the Saxons at Watchet.

The Anglo-Saxon Chronicle records that in 1067, Gytha Thorkelsdóttir, mother of Harold II, the last Anglo-Saxon king of England, stayed on the island before travelling to St Omer in France after the Norman conquest of England. After the invasion, Robert Fitzhamon formed the Shire of Glamorgan in Wales proper, with Cardiff Castle at the centre of his new domain. Flat Holm came within the parish boundary of St Mary's, one of Cardiff's two parish churches, and was kept as a hereditary property of the Norman Lords of Glamorgan.

A survey by archaeologist Howard Thomas in 1979 unearthed a number of medieval potsherds in the vicinity of the farmhouse and found evidence of continuous occupation of the island including middens containing numerous animal bones along with oyster and cockle shells. Fragments of green glazed jugs and flagons from the late 12th to 13th century and shards of pottery from the 14th century were also found on the island. The presence of Pennant sandstone roofing tiles and a fragment of a 14th-century glazed ridge tile indicate the existence of a substantial medieval building, possibly a chapel, demolished when the present farmhouse was constructed. Property records from 1542 show that King Henry VIII granted a lease to farm the island to a gentleman by the name of Edmund Tournor. His family remained on Flat Holm until the end of the 17th century when the lease passed to Joseph Robins.

=== 18th century – smuggling ===
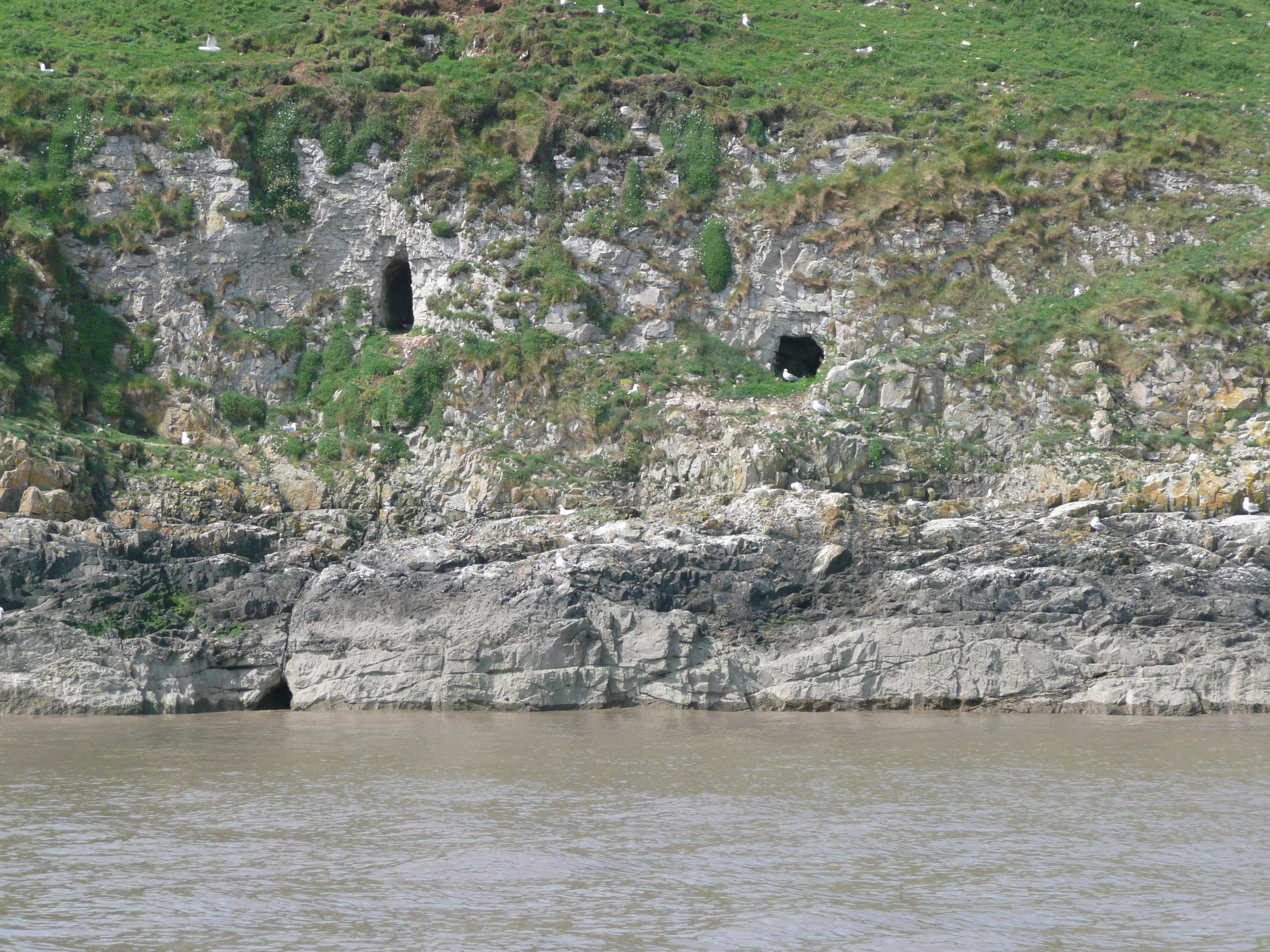
Cave and mineshaft in the east cliffs of Flat Holm

During the 18th century, the island's location made it an ideal base for smuggling. It has been alleged that an old mine shaft on the north side of the island connects with a series of natural tunnels, and a concealed exit to the sea. Although Flat Holm was in full view of both the Welsh and English coasts, customs authorities were powerless to act as they had no boat to take them to the island. According to tradition, a small cave in the east cliff at Flat Holm was used for the storage of contraband, mainly tea and brandy.

=== 19th century – Seafarer's Mission and Marconi ===
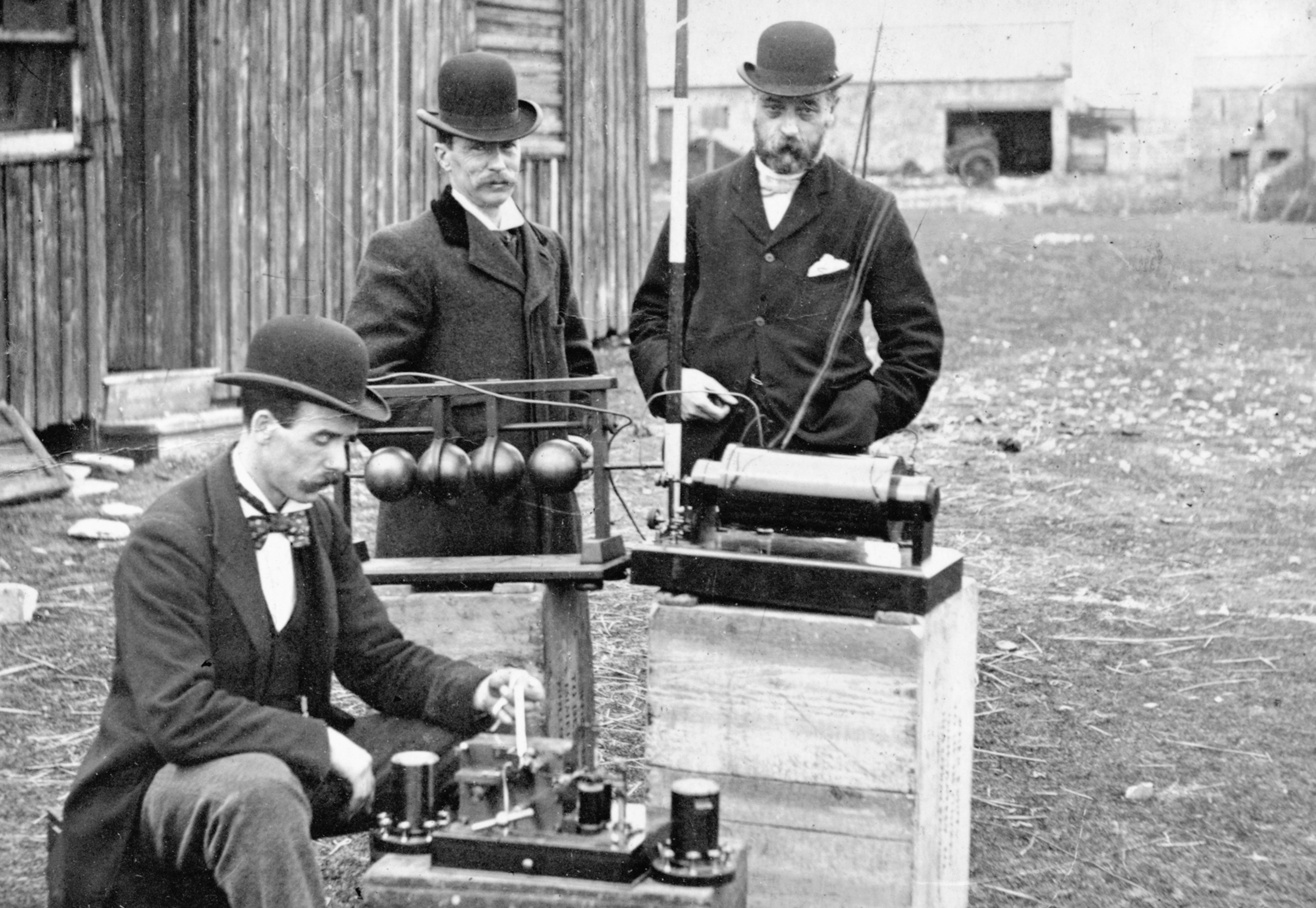
Post Office Engineers inspect Marconi's equipment on Flat Holm, May 1897

In 1835, clergyman John Ashley from Clevedon voluntarily ministered to the population of the island. Ashley created the Bristol Channel Mission in order to serve seafarers on the 400 sailing vessels which used the Bristol Channel. The mission would later become the Mission to Seafarers, which still provides ministerial services to sailors in over 300 ports.

On 13 May 1897, a 22-year-old Italian inventor named Guglielmo Marconi, assisted by a Cardiff Post Office engineer named George Kemp, transmitted the first Wireless signals over open sea from Flat Holm to Lavernock Point near Penarth, Wales. Having failed to interest the Italian government in his project, Marconi had brought his telegraphy system to Britain. Here he met Welshman William Preece who was at that time Chief Engineer of the General Post Office and a major figure in the field. Marconi and Preece erected a 34 m (112 ft) high transmitting mast on Flat Holm as well as a 30 m (98 ft) receiving mast at Lavernock Point. The first trials on 11 May and 12 failed. On 13 May, the mast at Lavernock was raised to 50 m (160 ft) and the signals were received clearly. The message sent by Morse Code was "Are you ready"; the original paper Morse slip, signed by both Marconi and Kemp, is now in the National Museum of Wales.

=== Shipwrecks ===
The treacherous conditions for ships around the island led to several shipwrecks. The British passenger vessel Tapley lost seven passengers when she became stranded on Flat Holm in January 1773 on her passage from Cork, Ireland to Bristol.

On 23 October 1817, a British sloop, William and Mary, foundered after hitting the three rocky islets known as The Wolves which are not far from near Flat Holm. The ship was en route from Bristol to Waterford and sank within 15 minutes. The ship's mate, John Outridge, and two sailors made off in the only lifeboat. 15 survivors were later rescued, having clung to the ship's rigging, but 54 other passengers were lost. 50 of the bodies were recovered from the ship and were buried on Flat Holm.

In 1938 the steamship Norman Queen ran ashore on Flat Holm but was refloated, and in 1941 the steamship Middlesex was lost.

== Geography ==
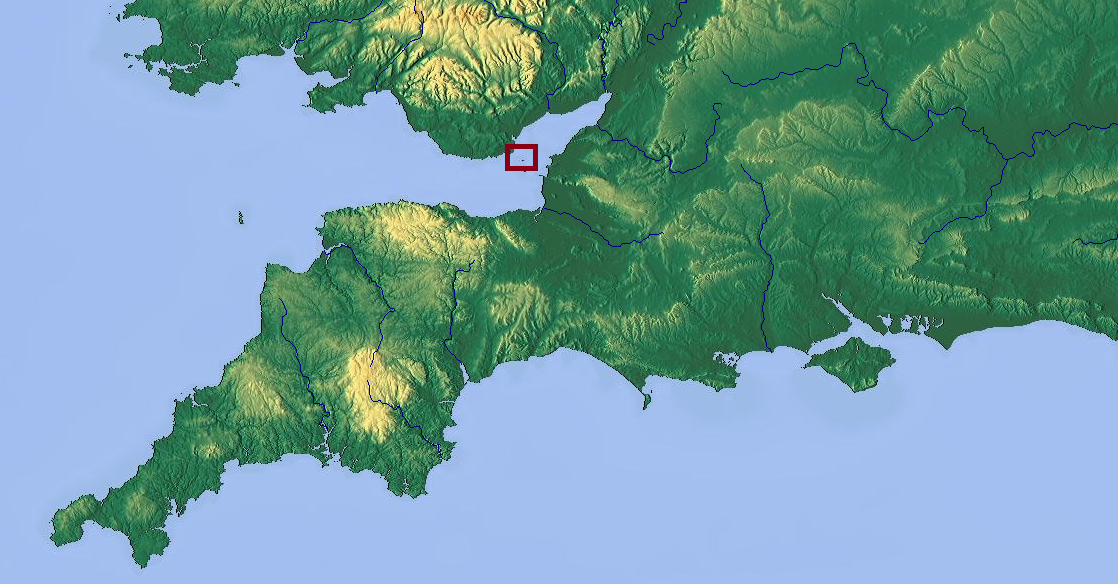
Map showing location in southwestern United Kingdom

=== Description ===
Flat Holm, in the Bristol Channel, is a small, almost circular, limestone island, approximately 620 m (2,030 ft) in diameter, covering 35 ha (86 acres). It rises in a gentle slope from the exposed western rocky shore to more sheltered easterly cliffs, at the top of which stands the prominent lighthouse. At its highest point it is 32 m (105 ft) above sea level. About 1.3 km (0.81 mi) northwest of Flat Holm are three rocky islets collectively known as The Wolves, measuring approximately 25 m (82 ft) by 20 m (66 ft).

=== Severn Barrage study ===
The tidal range of the Bristol Channel is 15 m (49 ft); second only to the Bay of Fundy in Eastern Canada. If a Severn Barrage were ever to be constructed it could have consequences for Flat Holm. The proposed barrage would pass two miles (3 km) west of the island. Feasibility studies were begun in 2007. In March 2025, the Severn Estuary Commission concluded that "development of tidal range energy in the Severn Estuary is feasible".

=== Flora and fauna ===
Flat Holm was designated a Site of Special Scientific Interest (SSSI) in 1972. The designation covers the maritime grassland which is mainly concentrated around the edges of the island.

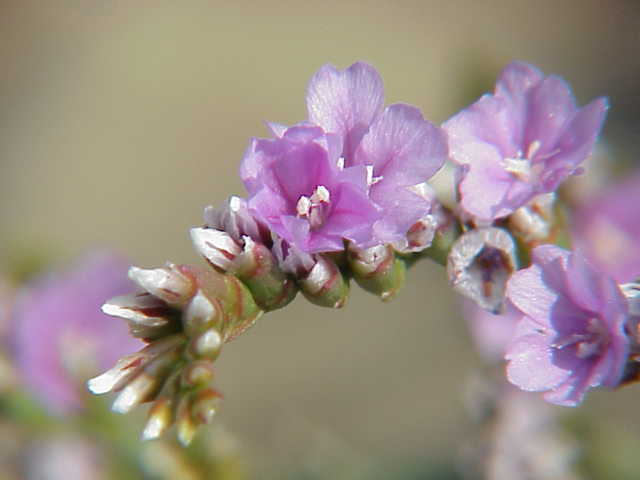
Rock sea-lavender

There are no endemic plant species but the relative isolation of the island has allowed a number of hardy species such as bird's-foot trefoil (Lotus corniculatus) and biting stonecrop (Sedum acre) to thrive. There are also a number of relatively rare plants, such as rock sea-lavender (Limonium binervosum), and wild leek (Allium ampeloprasum). The leek grows to 6 ft (1.8 m) and Flat Holm is one of only five places in the UK where it is found. Related to the onion, the leek has a bulb that grows for several years producing only leaves, then blooms with large purple flowers that smell of garlic. After flowering the bulb dies and produces bulblets.

Others plants may have been introduced by the Augustinian Community for their medicinal uses. These include dove's-foot crane's-bill Geranium molle, an anodyne plant claimed by Nicholas Culpeper to have a wide range of medicinal uses and an "excellent good cure for those that have inward wounds, hurts, or bruises, both to stay the bleeding, to dissolve and expel the congealed blood, and to heal the parts, as also to cleanse and heal outward sores, ulcers and fistulas". The wild peony (Paeonia mascula) was introduced to the island (and nearby Steep Holm), possibly by monks, and has naturalised. Thirty-seven plants were taken to the island from Steep Holm by Frank Harris, the farmer at the time, in the 1930s, many of which died during the World War II occupation and fortification of the island. One remaining plant was reintroduced by David Worall, the Flat Holm Warden, in 1982 and is protected by fencing near the path to the lighthouse. A few plants grown from seed also survive in the island's farmhouse garden.

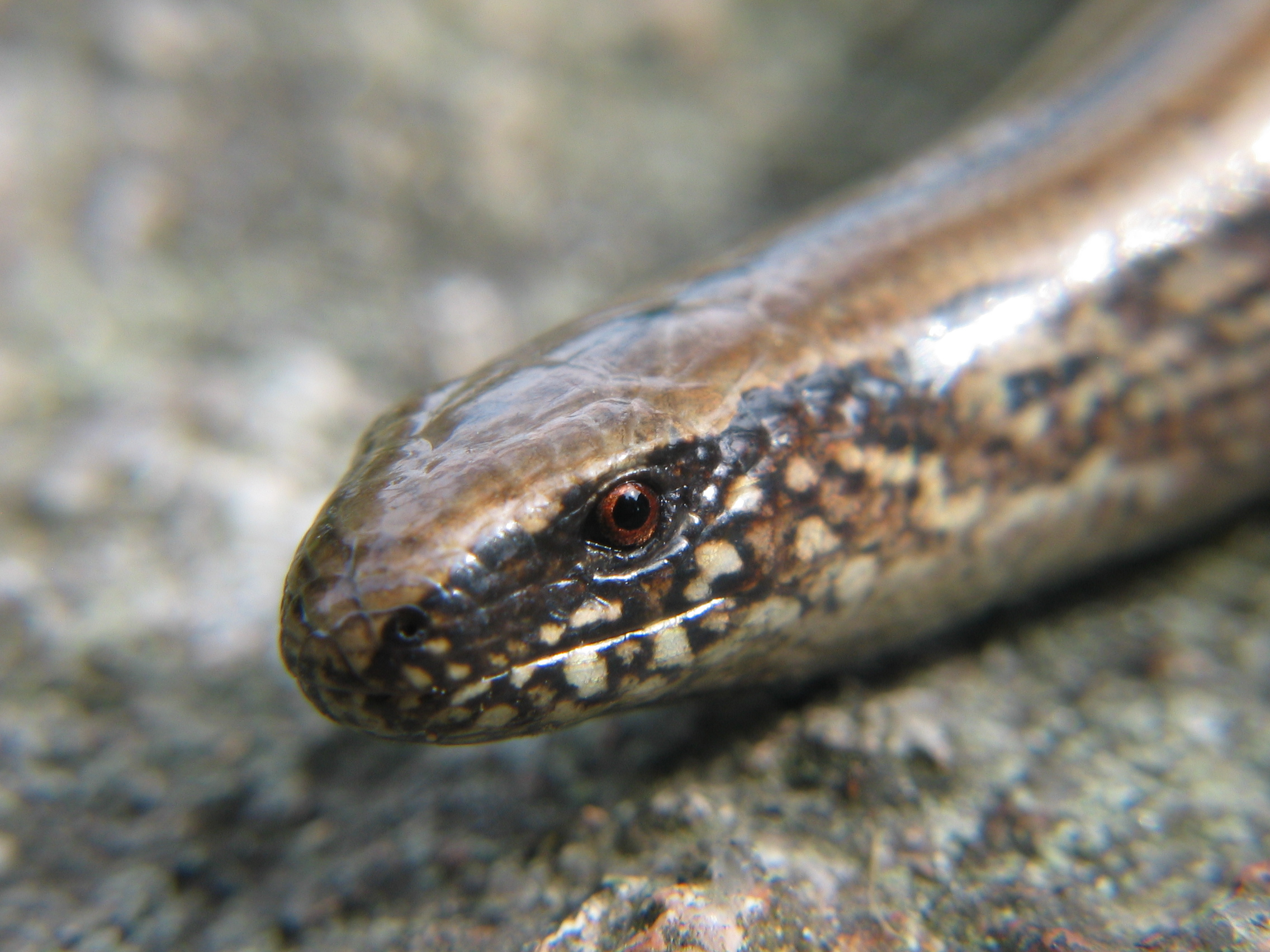
Slowworm

The island has a significant breeding colony of over 4,000 pairs of lesser black-backed gulls (Larus fuscus), 400 pairs of herring gulls (Larus argentatus), 2 pairs of great black-backed gulls (Larus marinus) and varying numbers of common shelduck (Tadorna tadorna) and Eurasian oystercatchers (Haematopus ostralegus). The feeding habits of lesser black-backed gulls were studied in 1989, and it was shown that smaller clutches were laid than in previous years and that supplementary feeding did not increase egg or clutch size. Other birds seen on the island include shelduck, oystercatchers, rock pipits, finches, turnstone and dunlin.

The island is also home to slow worms (Anguis fragilis). Flat Holm's slow worm population has unusually large blue markings.

The island's rabbit population, introduced for farming in the 12th century, suffers from myxomatosis, which effectively contains the numbers. The island has been grazed since 1989, initially by goats, but also by sheep since 1992. In 1997 Soay sheep were introduced and as of 2008 there are 28 sheep grazing wild on the island. Numbers of Soay sheep had declined by 2022 so Boreray sheep were introduced.

== Governance ==
Flat Holm is part of Wales, part of the local authority electoral ward of Butetown (Cardiff) and the UK parliamentary constituency of Cardiff South and Penarth.

In 1975, the South Glamorgan County Council leased the island for the next 99 years. In March 1995, the county council agreed to obtain Flat Holm through a 50-year lease from the Crown Estate starting on 12 December 1995. Flat Holm is now designated as a Local Nature Reserve, as stipulated in that lease. It is managed by the Cardiff Council as The Flat Holm Project. The work of the Flat Holm Project is supported by the registered charity the Flat Holm Society.

In June 2021 Cardiff Council allocated £1.1 million (including £645,000 from the National Lottery Heritage Fund) to repair the Foghorn Station roof, stabilise and re-roof the Old Cholera Hospital, and create new off-island immersive guided tours of Flat Holm.

The purpose of the Flat Holm Project is to display the island's sustainable technologies. Originally, power was supplied by a variety of diesel generators but in 2006, a 'mini-grid' was installed, 90% powered by solar and wind. Filtered rainwater provides the island's water needs, and a biomass boiler powered partly by driftwood provides hot water and heating.

== Buildings ==
=== Lighthouse and foghorn station ===
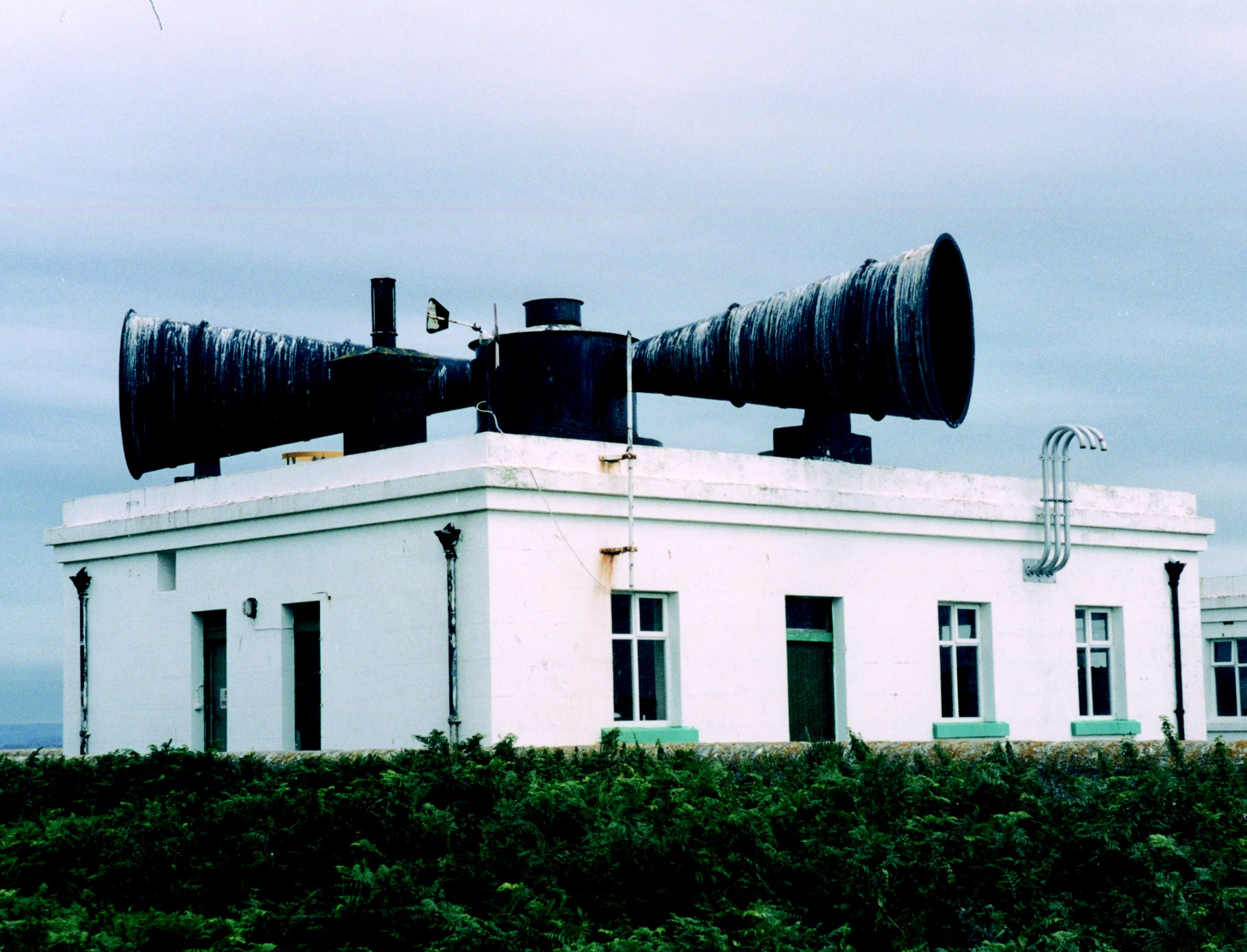
Foghorn building

The lighthouse, a Grade II listed building, was renovated in 1929 from a largely 19th century construction, to include accommodation for up to four keepers. In 1988, the lighthouse became fully automated. In 1997, the light was modernised and converted to solar power. It is now monitored and controlled by the Trinity House Operations Control Centre at Harwich, in Essex. The oil store and enclosure walls are also Grade II listed.

Built by Trinity House in 1906, the foghorn building is a Grade II listed building and self-catering accommodation. The siren was originally powered by an 11 kW (15 hp) engine and could be clearly heard by people living on both coasts. Volunteers from the Flat Holm Society, with help from the Prince's Trust, restored the horn and engines in the 1960s.

=== Farmhouse ===
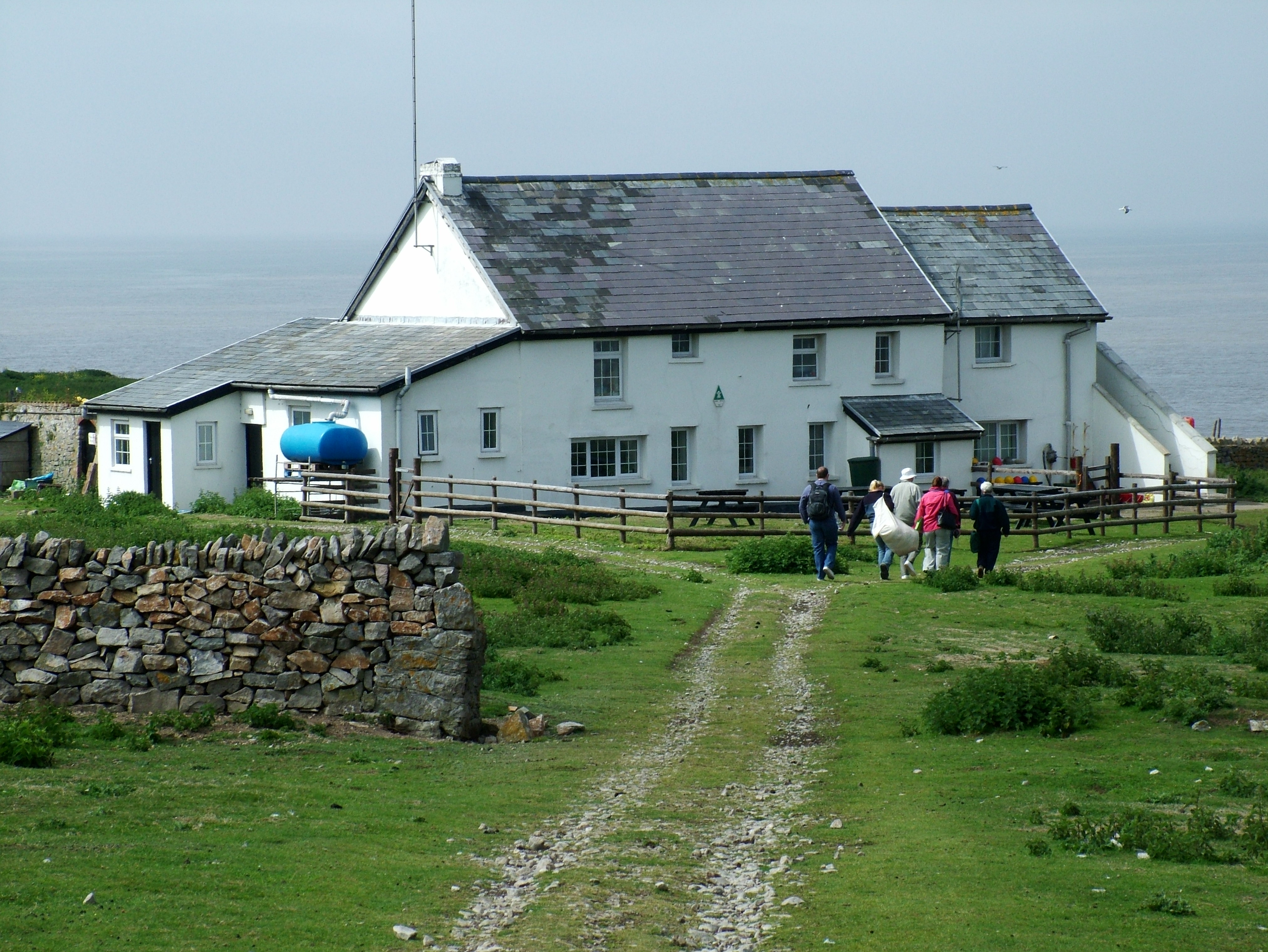
Flat Holm farm house

Records show that monks from St Augustine's Abbey in Bristol established a dairy farm and grange on the island after Flat Holm was granted to them by Robert, Earl of Gloucester in 1150. Dr Thomas Turner, who was stranded on Flat Holm during a visit in 1815, passed the time by exploring the island. He noted that the tax-exempt abbey farm was prospering and counted "seven cows, two bulls, five sheep, one horse, two pigs and two dogs". In 1897 the farmhouse was converted into The Flat Holm Hotel, and a bar and skittle alley were added, but the hotel closed after a few years. The farmhouse has been renovated by the Flat Holm Project and is now used as accommodation for visitors.

=== Batteries and barracks ===
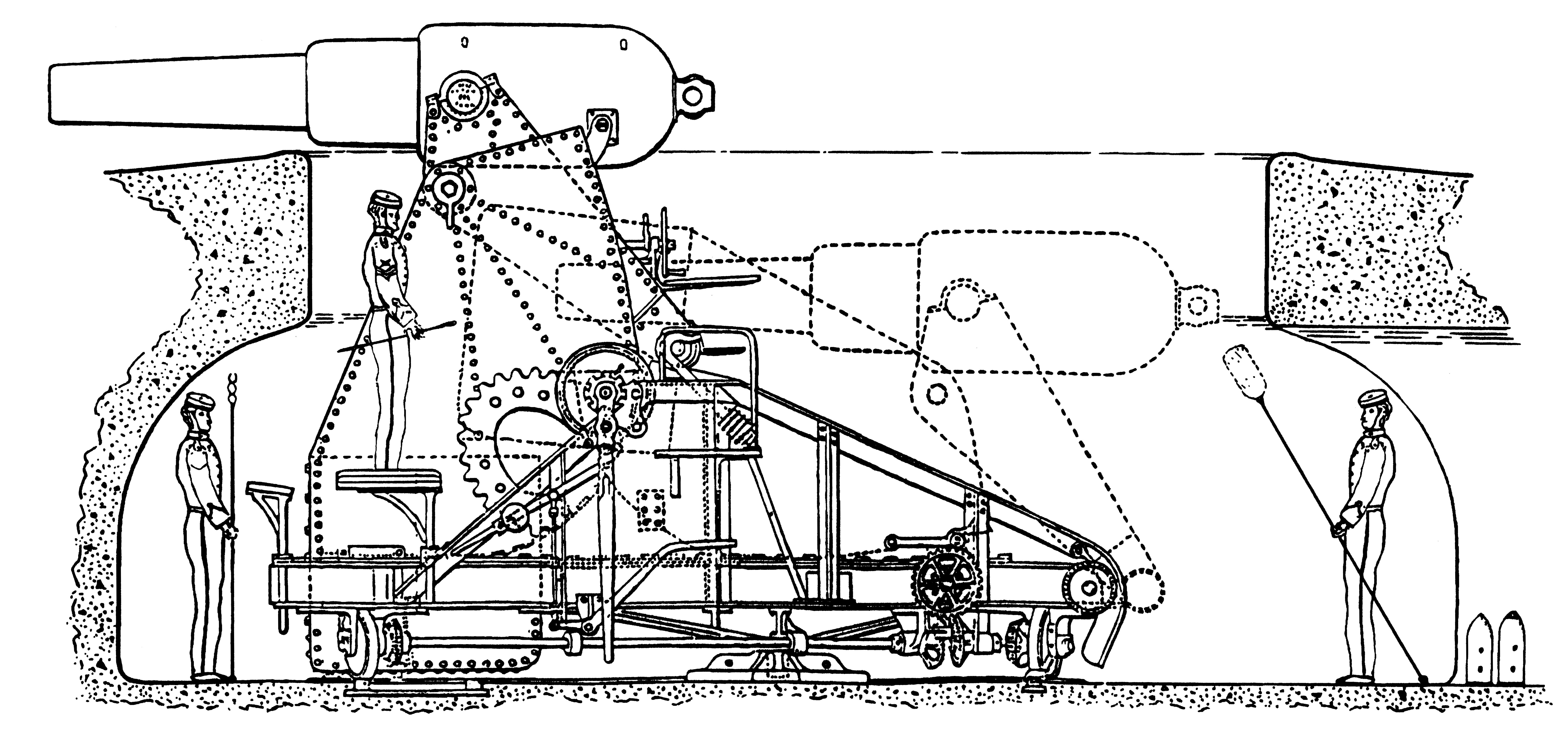
Moncrieff 'disappearing gun'

Flat Holm was fortified in the 1860s following a visit by Queen Victoria and Prince Albert to France, where they had been concerned by the strength of the French Navy. The Royal Commission on the Defence of the United Kingdom, under direction of Lord Palmerston, recommended fortification of the coast in 1865. The defences on the island, which became part of a line of defences known as the Palmerston Forts, were completed in 1869.

Flat Holm Battery is a series of gun emplacements on Flat Holm built to protect Bristol and Cardiff across the channel. There are remains of four battery sites on the island:

- Castle Rock Battery: three guns in two Moncrieff pits and one open-backed pit
- Farm House Battery: two guns in one full Moncrieff pit and one open-backed pit
- Well Battery: one gun in an open-backed Moncrieff pit. The gun was removed by Army Apprentices in 1964.
- Lighthouse Battery: three guns in two full Moncrieff pits and one open-backed pit

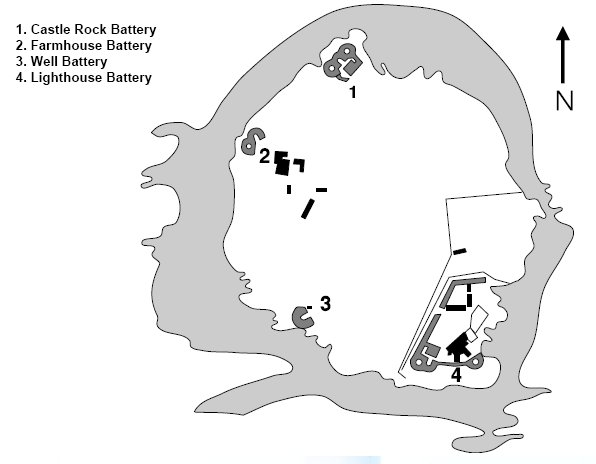
Flat Holm gun battery sites

These four emplacements run from the northern to the southern point of the island, along the western coast. Nine Rifled muzzle loaders (RMLs) on disappearing Moncrieff carriages were built at the Royal Gun Foundry, Woolwich. They were mounted in four separate batteries, all in Moncrieff pits, 2 m (7 ft) in diameter and 3 m (10 ft) deep, constructed of limestone blocks and bricks. These pits had the advantage of being almost invisible to shipping and also offered protection to the gun crews. The RML 7-inch 7 ton guns were too heavy for mobile land service. They consisted of a steel rifle tube surrounded by wrought iron coils, and cascabel, with an overall length of each gun is 361 centimetres (142 in). They used a 52.3 kg (115 lb) Palliser shell and were mounted on the Moncrieff disappearing carriage. The guns were never needed and were fired only for test purposes.

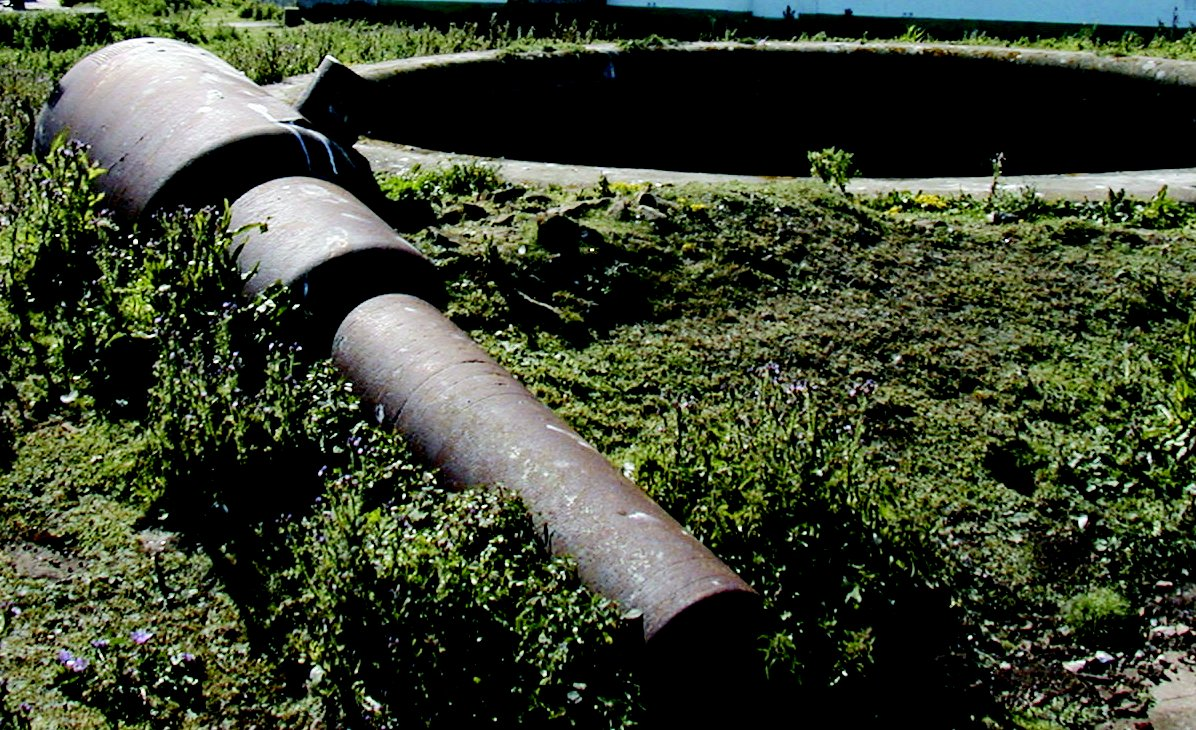
Cannon and Moncrieff pit near the lighthouse

In 1869, stone barracks were built to sleep up to 50 men. The men were stationed on the island to keep the guns in good working order but the garrison would have been reinforced by regular artillery and volunteer troops if ever an invasion had been imminent. The barracks for the battery were located near the southernmost battery emplacement. Other fortifications included a large drainage basin, underground storage tank, an administrative building and a secure store. A "ditch-and-bank" system served to protect the Lighthouse Battery from cross-island attack. The barracks were vacated in 1901 and the buildings have now been restored by the Flat Holm Project for educational use.

=== Radar station ===
At the outbreak of World War II over 350 soldiers of the Royal Artillery were stationed on the island. Flat Holm was re-armed with four 4.5-inch guns and associated searchlights for anti-aircraft and close defence, together with two 40mm Bofors guns. A GL (Gun Laying) Mk II radar station was also placed in the centre of the island. The structures formed part of the Fixed Defences, and protected the Atlantic shipping convoys between Cardiff, Barry, and Flat Holm. The station became non-operational in 1944. Flat Holm's two helipads remain serviceable, currently for emergency use.

=== Isolation hospital ===
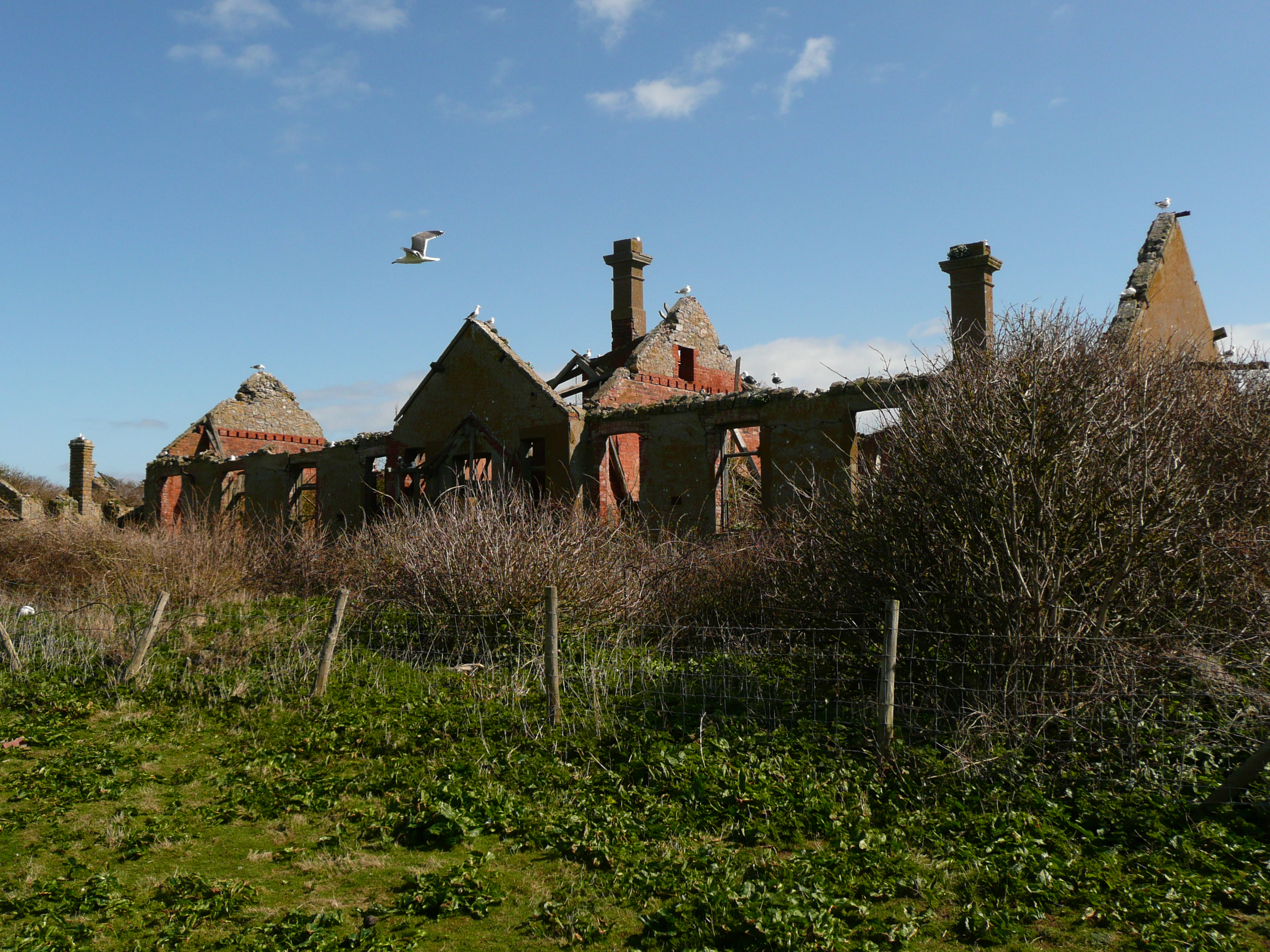
Cholera Hospital ruins

In July 1883, the steamship Rishanglys left three seamen on the island who were believed to be suffering from cholera, one of whom subsequently died. The only accommodation was a canvas tent, and the regular inhabitants of the island petitioned Cardiff council for compensation, complaining of loss of income from visitors and difficulty in selling vegetables grown on their farm at the market in Cardiff. In 1896, the Marquis of Bute, then-owner of Flat Holm, agreed to lease all the land that was not already in use by the military or the lighthouse to the Cardiff Corporation for £50 per year. The corporation then built a permanent sanatorium on the land for use by cholera patients. The building was described in The Lancet as a "pavilion" comprising two six-bed wards and a nurse's room. In 1893, three more sailors arrived in Cardiff from Marseille on the SS Blue Jacket and were suspected of having cholera. The first engineer, Thomas Smith, and able seaman Robert Doran, were deported to the isolation hospital on Flat Holm to prevent spread of the disease. The second mate, P. J. Morris, was also sent to the island as a precautionary measure, but quickly recovered. The Flat Holm sanatorium is unique in being the only Victorian isolation hospital sited on a British offshore island. The last patient to die in the hospital, a victim of bubonic plague, was cremated on the island at the end of the 19th century. The hospital finally closed in 1935 and has remained derelict since. Both the hospital main block and laundry block are Grade II listed buildings and considered to be "at risk".

== Media ==
The island has been used as a location for the filming of drama, including Tower of Terror (1941) and the BBC TV series Torchwood episode "Adrift" (2008). It has also been used for nature documentaries by the BBC including; Let's Look at Wales (1979), Countryfile (2008), Weatherman Walking and Not in My Nature (2008).

== See also ==
- List of lighthouses in Wales
- Steep Holm
