= Cosmeston Lakes Country Park =

Country park in the Vale of Glamorgan, Wales

Cosmeston Lake
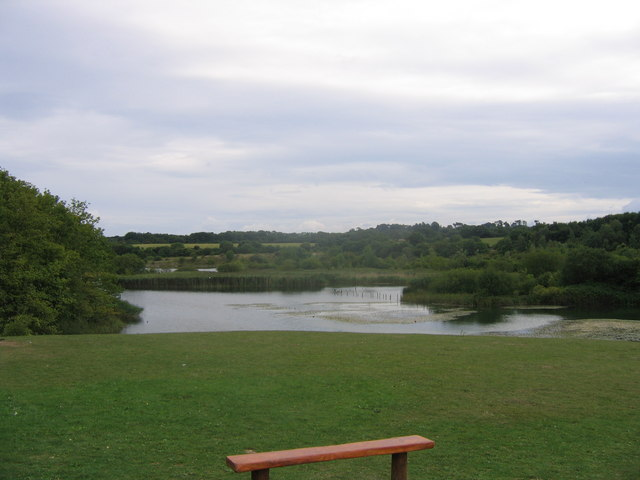
- from the East

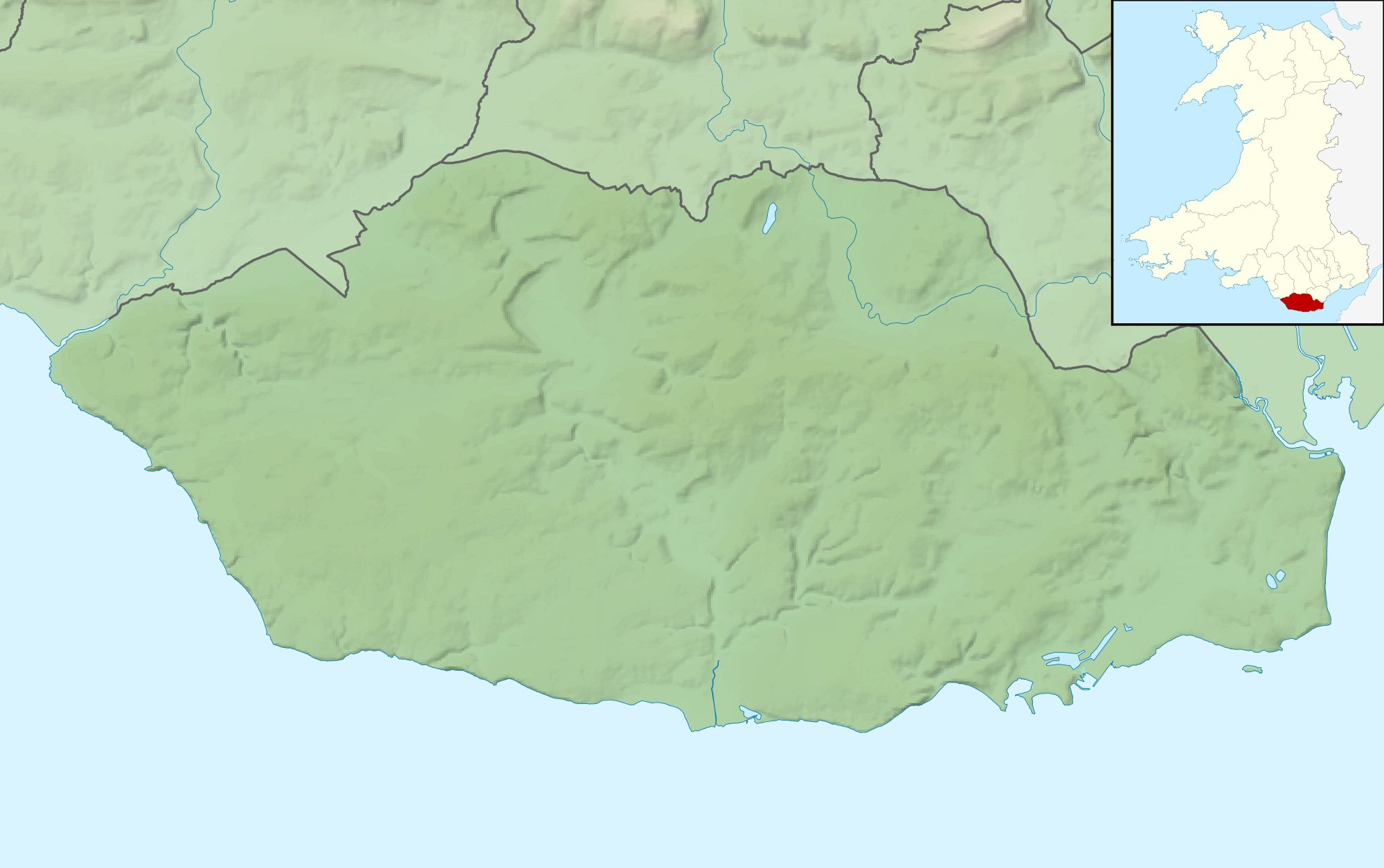
- Location within Vale of Glamorgan
- Location: Penarth, Vale of Glamorgan, Wales
- Coordinates: 51°25′N 3°11′W
- Type: artificial, flooded quarry
- Basin countries: Wales
- Surface area: 15 ha (37 acres)
- Max. depth: 9 m (30 ft)
- Islands: one
- Settlements: Cosmeston Medieval Village

Cosmeston Lakes Country Park is a public country park in Wales, owned and managed by Vale of Glamorgan Council. It is situated between Penarth and Sully, Vale of Glamorgan, 7.3 miles (11.7 kilometres) from Cardiff. On 1 May 2013, the country park was designated a Local Nature Reserve. Parts are Sites of Special Scientific Interest. The park, visitor centre, and cafe are open all year round.

== General ==
The main feature at this country park are the two large lakes divided by a bridge on the main footpath 'mile road'. The country park has a variety of habitats covering over 100 hectares of land and water, with some areas designated a Site of Special Scientific Interest, protecting the rare and diverse plant and animal species.

Within the country park Cosmeston Medieval Village can be found.

== Park history ==
The park is located on land that was once the enclosed fields of croft farms. The farming would have been poor because of the underlying limestone and the land being kept permanently wet by many natural springs.

The site was a commercial limestone quarry operation owned by the British Portland Cement Manufacturers and later Blue Circle. Development started in 1886 and production commenced in 1889. The quarries here provided limestone for the large cement works that stood until 1970 on the site of the present Cosmeston housing estate opposite the country park. The peak year of production was 1962, when 175,000 tons of cement were manufactured. Many of the early paving slabs laid in Penarth were made from the ‘Dragon’ brand of cement. The works finally shut in November 1969. The quarries were closed in June 1970. The only factory building left standing today is the Ego at The Schooner Inn restaurant, previously a Harvester chain restaurant. Once quarrying ceased two of the excavated sites were used for landfill and the remaining two naturally flooded creating the lakes that are seen today.

The park was subsequently developed and opened in 1978, through funding from the Countryside Commission. A circular path was created around the lake, with boardwalks constructed over the wetland areas. It was during the laying of the paths, thinning of dense undergrowth and general landscaping that the remains of the former village were found, excavated, and developed into a visitor attraction.

The park shares its eastern boundary with the historic Glamorganshire Golf Club.

Cosmeston Lakes parkrun started on 7 December 2019 and takes place every Saturday at 09:00am.

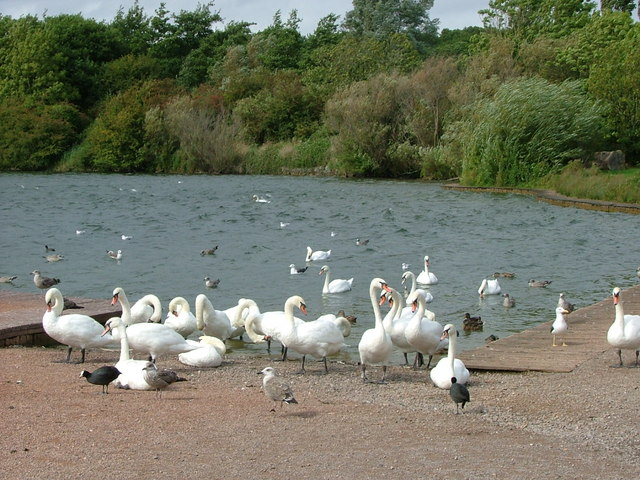
Swans at Cosmeston

== Facilities ==
Facilities at the park include car parking, (chargeable, except for Blue Badge holders), coach parking, picnic benches, adventure play area, facilities for cleaning boats after being on the water, barbecue areas for hire, plus an information centre with cafe and ice cream kiosk. The lake is populated by a wide range of water fowl, including swans, mallards, grebes, and coots etc. The Eastern half of the lake is open for hire to non motorised water sports clubs affiliated with the Vale of Glamorgan Council.

The Ranger Service

Cosmeston Lakes Country Park offers an environmental education programme to primary schools and other groups all year round, run by the Ranger Service.
