= Penarth =

Town in the Vale of Glamorgan, Wales

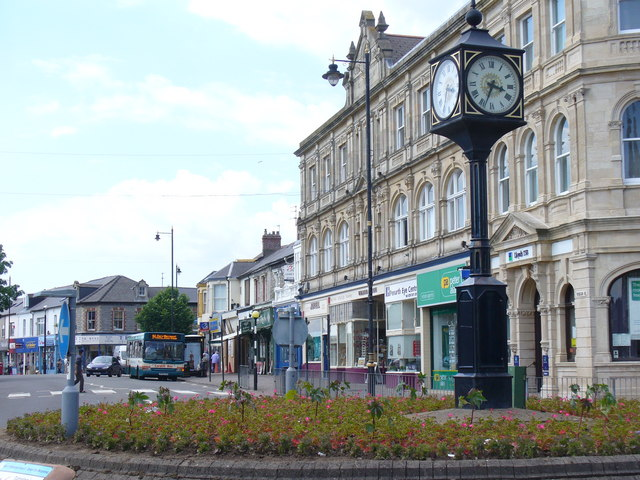
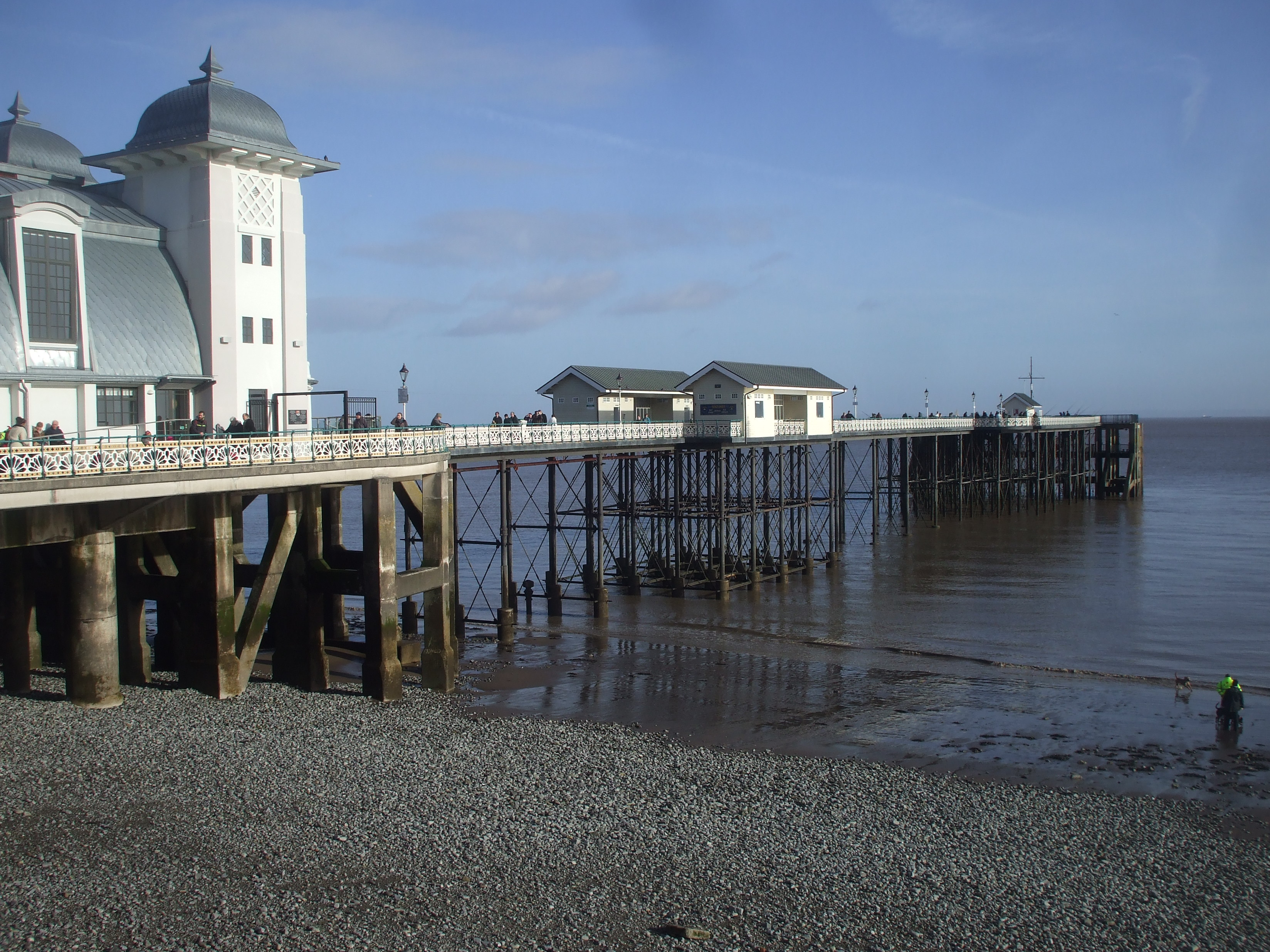
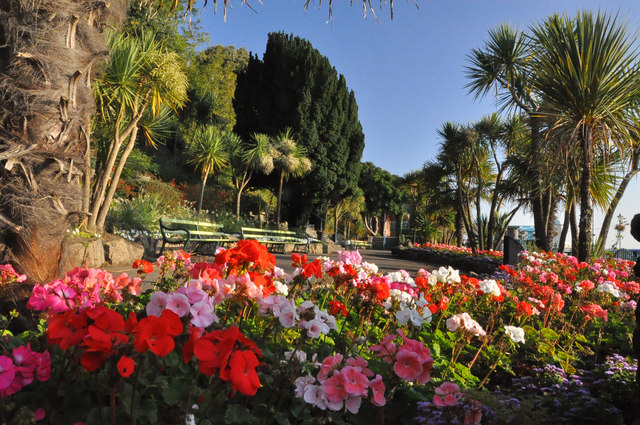
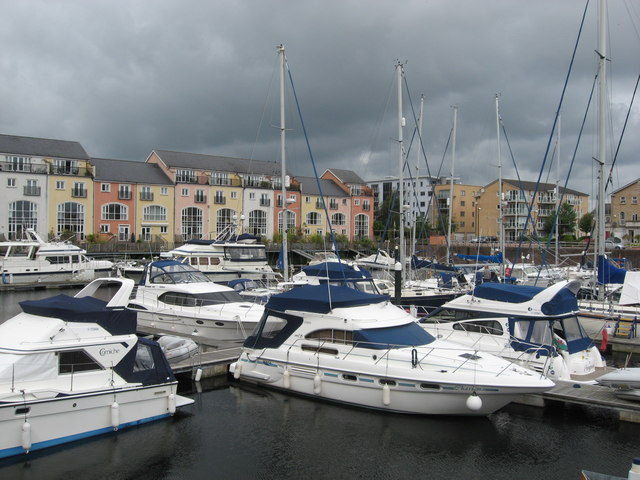
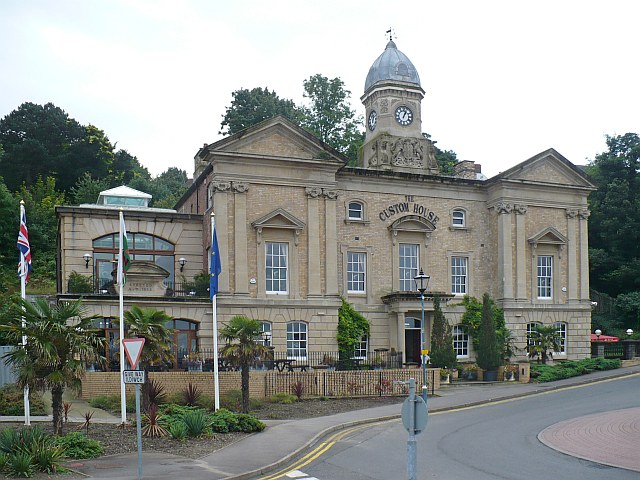
- From the top clockwise, Windsor Road the main commercial area, Italian Gardens, Custom House, Penarth Marina, Penarth Pier

- Location within the Vale of Glamorgan
- Population: 22,083 (2011)
- OS grid reference: ST185715
- Community: Penarth
- Principal area: Vale of Glamorgan
- Preserved county: South Glamorgan
- Country: Wales
- Sovereign state: United Kingdom
- Post town: PENARTH
- Postcode district: CF64
- Dialling code: 029
- Police: South Wales
- Fire: South Wales
- Ambulance: Welsh
- UK Parliament: Cardiff South & Penarth
- Senedd Cymru – Welsh Parliament: Cardiff South and Penarth

Penarth (/pɛnˈɑːrθ/ pen-ARTH, Welsh: [pɛnˈarθ]) is a town and community in the Vale of Glamorgan, Wales, approximately three miles (five kilometres) south of Cardiff city centre on the west shore of the Severn Estuary at the southern end of Cardiff Bay.

Penarth is a seaside resort in the Cardiff Urban Area, and the second largest town in the Vale of Glamorgan, next only to the administrative centre of Barry.

During the Victorian era Penarth was a highly popular holiday destination, promoted nationally as "The Garden by the Sea", and was packed by visitors from the Midlands and the West Country as well as day trippers from the South Wales valleys, mostly arriving by train. Today, the town, with its traditional seafront, continues to be a regular summer holiday destination (predominantly for older visitors), but their numbers are much lower than was common from Victorian times until the 1960s, when cheap overseas package holidays were introduced.

Although the number of holiday visitors has greatly declined, the town retains a substantial retired population, representing over 24% of residents, but Penarth is now predominantly a dormitory town for Cardiff commuters. The town's population was recorded as 20,396 in the 2001 United Kingdom census. The built-up area had a population of 27,226, but this figure does not include nearby suburb Dinas Powys.

The town retains extensive surviving Victorian and Edwardian architecture in many traditional parts of the town.

== Toponymy ==
Insignia and Crest Motto: Cynghori er Llesiant (translates as Counsel for Benefit or Gain)

"Penarth" is a Welsh placename and could be a combination of pen meaning head and arth meaning bear, hence 'Head of the Bear' or 'Bear's Head'. This was the accepted translation for several hundred years and is still reflected in the town's coat of arms which depicts bears. Modern scholars have suggested that the name is shortened from an original "Pen-y-garth", where garth means cliff, hence 'Head of the cliff' or 'Clifftops'. and the Welsh-English dictionary Y Geiriadur Mawr (The Big Dictionary: Gomer Press) reveals that penardd/penarth eb (feminine noun) means 'promontory'.

The civic town coat of arms was drawn by the town's architect in 1875 from a detailed brief prepared by the Town Board. It features a bear's head above a shield supported by two further bears standing. The shield contains a Draig Goch to denote that the town is in Wales and a sailing vessel recognising Penarth's long association with sea commerce.

== History ==
=== Early history ===
The Penarth area has a history of human inhabitation dating back at least 5000 years. In 1956 several Neolithic stone axe heads were found in the town. A large hoard of Roman rings and coins were also discovered at nearby Sully.

From the 12th century until 1543 the lands of Penarth were owned by the canons of St Augustine, Bristol. The Norman church of St Augustine (on the headland) dates from this period. After the dissolution of the monasteries the ownership transferred to the dean and chapter of Bristol Cathedral.

The manor lands were leased to the Earls of Plymouth of St. Fagans Castle. In 1853 the family purchased the manor outright.

Because the surrounding land was owned by religious institutions from an early date, there was no need for a large family house in Penarth. The oldest building in the area is a Tudor mansion, owned by the Herbert family, on the hillside at Cogan Pill. This has since been converted into a chain restaurant.

Piracy was prevalent on the coast near Penarth and, in the 1570s, a Special Commission being set up to investigate and suppress it. Leading family members in Penarth were believed to be implicated.

Penarth's medieval walled Sheriff's Pound, an early form of multi-purpose gaol, remained in use until the late 18th century, as a place to retain stray sheep, cattle and pigs or to imprison thieves, rustlers and vagabonds. It was located roughly where the car park now stands, at the rear of the NatWest Bank in Plymouth Road.

In 1803, Penarth is recorded as having between 800 and 900 acres (320 and 360 hectares) of land under cultivation as several farms. In the 1801 census, there were just 72 people living in the Manor. Even as late as 1851, Penarth was still little more than a small rural farming and fishing village since medieval times, with just 24 houses and 105 residents, being one of five parishes contained within the Hundred of Dinas Powys, with a combined population of just over 300. Before the pier and dock were built, there was a tiny fleet of local sail-powered fishing vessels based on the main town beach that tied up on the seafront quayside.

The Plymouth estate office retained control over the planning, building and development of the new town, offering 99-year leases and remaining the ground landlord. All householders in Penarth were tenants of the Plymouth Estates, paying an annual ground rent. The situation would not change until the Leasehold Reform Act 1967, that gave householders the choice of purchasing their freehold or negotiating 999 year extensions on their short leases.

The earliest homes built in the town were streets of terraced houses with busy corner shops and public houses on almost every corner, following the contours of the headland and in the rapidly expanding Cogan area near the docks. Local grey limestone, quarried from what is now Cwrt-y-vil playing fields, gave a particular character to the surviving older buildings of the town. To the south of the town centre, imposing detached villa residences along the cliff tops looked across the Channel to the Somerset coast and the islands of Flat Holm (Welsh: Ynys Echni) and Steep Holm (Welsh: Ynys Rhonech). The villas were built by wealthy shipping and dock owners from Cardiff who were moving out of the industrialised city for a more genteel and sophisticated lifestyle.

=== Victorian developments ===
By 1861, the number of people in the five parishes had increased to 1,898 and to 3,382 by 1871. In 1875, three of the constituent parishes - Penarth, Cogan, and Llandough - were merged into the Penarth Local Board, giving a population of 6,228 persons by 1881. This figure had doubled by 1891 with the opening of the railway and had increased even further by 1901 to 14,228 persons. The town of Penarth thus owes its development to the massive expansion of the South Wales coalfield in the 19th century. Its proximity to Cardiff, which was the natural outlet for the industrial valleys of Glamorgan, and its natural waterfront meant that Penarth was ideally situated to contribute to meeting the world's demand for Welsh coal through the construction of the docks.

The development of the town continued to be rapid and Penarth soon became self-sufficient, with its own local government, a thriving shopping centre and many new community facilities. What is now the main shopping area of Windsor Road was originally residential housing, but the owners sacrificed their front gardens to build shop extensions, although the original house architecture can still be seen above the shops. Most of the town's fine architectural features owe their origin to the landowners of the time and the results of their vision can be seen by the many grand buildings and parks which make Penarth what it is today. Thanks to the generosity of those far sighted landowners, Penarth earned its wide reputation as "The Garden by the Sea" because of its beautiful parks and open spaces. Furthermore, many of the buildings and features of the town have led to a substantial part of the town being designated as a Conservation Area because of its Victorian/Edwardian architecture. Penarth's town library was opened in 1905, thanks to a donation by the Carnegie Trust. The town's gothic style Police Station and town gaol opened in 1864, opposite the Windsor Arms brewery.

With the arrival of the railway connection to the Welsh valleys in 1878 came the regular influx of day trippers, often hundreds of them at weekends and bank holidays. The developing summer holiday trade was supported by a large number of quality hotels that provided nearly two thousand bedspaces. The biggest and grandest of the hotels were the Esplanade Hotel on the seafront built in 1887, The Marine Hotel at the mouth of the docks, The Royal Hotel at the top of Arcot Street, The Washington Hotel opposite the library and The Glendale and Lansdowne hotels on Plymouth Road. Apart from the major hotels, accommodation was also available at the smaller Dock Hotel, Penarth Hotel, Ship Hotel, Westbourne Hotel, Plymouth Hotel, Windsor Hotel, Railway Hotel and dozens of mariners' lodging houses at the top end of the town. All have now closed with the exception of the Glendale and a handful of small and more recent bed and breakfast establishments.

A Royal Navy Hunt-class minesweeper was named HMS Penarth after the town in 1918 and survived the last nine months of the First World War, but only served for twelve months when it was sunk off the Yorkshire coast in 1919 after striking two mines. The vessel is remembered among the Royal Navy memorials at Portsmouth.

At one time, Penarth had two grand and decorative cinemas. The first was the Windsor Kinema on Windsor Road, originally converted from a 19th-century Territorial Army drill hall and later used as Monty Smith's garage until it closed in October 2015. The even grander Washington Cinema was built opposite the library in 1936 with a classical 'Art Deco' frontage, on the site of a former hotel and its tennis courts. The Washington closed as a cinema in 1971. After several years as a busy bingo hall, it has now been converted into a coffee house and art gallery, whilst retaining its original frontage.

Penarth's other distinctive art deco structure was the new General Post Office that was built in Albert Road in 1936. Closed in the 1980s, the building is Grade II listed and is now vacant. The rear yard, once used to stable horses for the horse-drawn Penarth to Cardiff bus service, is still used by the Post Office for mail and parcel sorting.

=== Penarth Dock ===
The contract for the building of Penarth Dock was placed in 1859 and the dock was opened six years later, constructed by a workforce of around 1,200 mostly Irish 'navvies' under the direction of chief engineer Harrison Hayter and implementing the design of civil engineer John Hawkshaw. At the Welsh coal trade's zenith in 1913 ships carried 4,660,648 tons of coal in a single year out of Penarth docks. In 1886 Isambard Kingdom Brunel's SS Great Britain, originally a passenger vessel but later converted as a coal trader departed from Penarth Dock on what would become its final voyage. A disastrous fire, during the voyage, all but destroyed the vessel and she foundered on the Falkland Islands, where she remained until salvaged and returned to Bristol Docks for restoration in the 1970s.

One feature of Penarth Dock was the tunnel underpass that connected Penarth dock to Ferry Road Grangetown under the River Ely. Not quite wide enough for motor vehicles it was used by commuting pedestrians and cyclists as a short cut to work in Cardiff. The circular tunnel was about 1/2 mile (800 metres) long with an entrance foyer at each end. Lined with cream and green coloured ceramic tiles, the route was lit originally by gaslight and later by electricity. Completed in 1899, from parts cast by T Gregory Engineering Works, Taffs Well, the tunnel remained in use until the autumn of 1965, when it was closed and the ends bricked up, after a series of violent muggings, repeated vandalism and the cost of maintenance becoming uneconomical. The tunnel entrance at the Penarth end was located near the lock gates, between the outer basin and the number one dock. This historic short cut route was 'almost' replicated and replaced in June 2008 with the opening of a pedestrian and cycle route across the new Cardiff Bay Barrage.

=== Penarth Pier ===
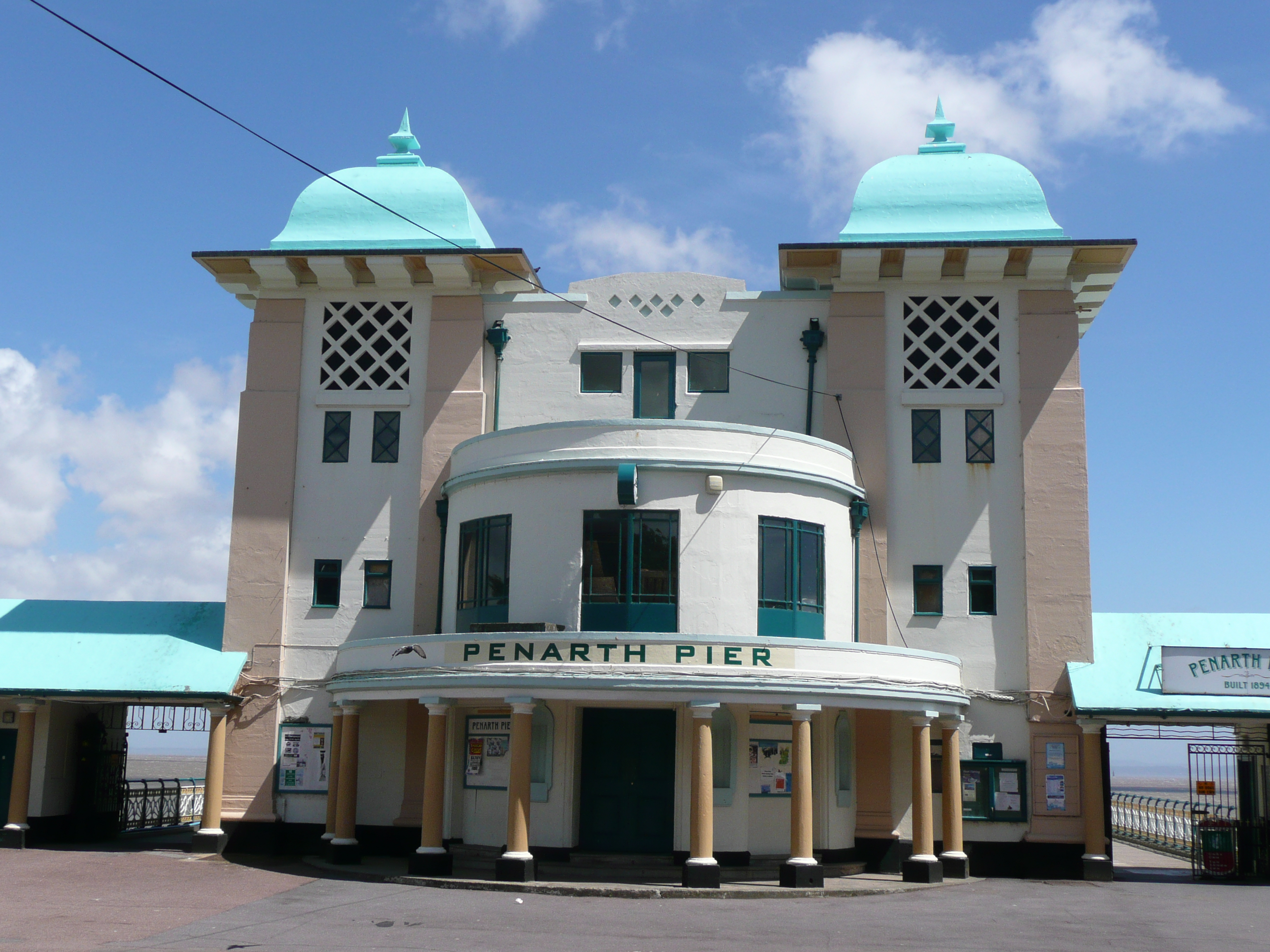
Penarth Pier entrance (2008)

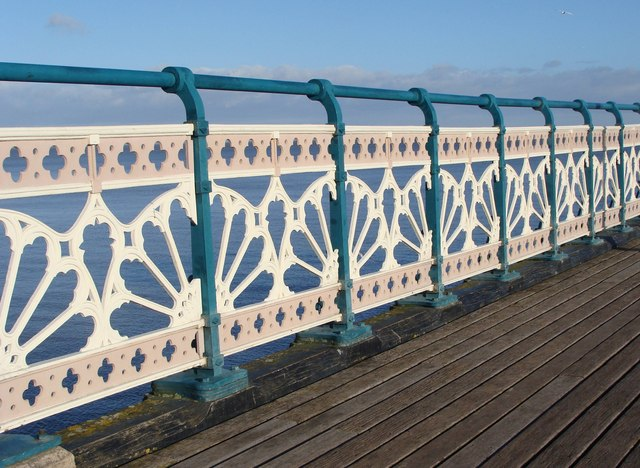
Penarth Pier railings detail

Because of the growing popularity of Penarth beach and the need for better communications with Cardiff, in 1856 the Cardiff Steam and Navigation Company started a regular ferry service between Cardiff and Penarth. This continued until 1903. Boats were loaded and unloaded at Penarth using a landing stage on wheels which was hauled up the beach.

In the 1880s, an attempt was made to construct a permanent pier. This was possibly because of the need to find a safer way to unload boats. However, construction ground to a halt at an early stage, when the London contractors went into liquidation.

The Penarth Pier Company was formed to make a second attempt at building a permanent pier. The foundations were laid in 1894 and the pier successfully opened in 1895, at 750 feet (230 metres) long, at 51°26′6″N 3°9′57″W.

In 1907, a small wooden "Concert Party" theatre was built at the seaward end. In 1929, the pier was bought by Penarth Urban District Council, who added a new pier-head berthing pontoon, and in 1930 the current art deco pavilion was added. In 1931, a fire started in the seaward-end theatre; a sea and land-based rescue was able to save all 800 people on board at the time. The pier was rebuilt, strengthened with additional concrete columns, but without the wooden theatre.

In 1947, the 7,130 ton steamship the SS Port Royal Park, under the flag of the Tavistock Shipping Company, collided with the pier, causing severe damage that was not repaired for several years.

In August 1966, a 600-ton pleasure steamer, Bristol Queen, hit the pier causing an estimated £25,000 damage.

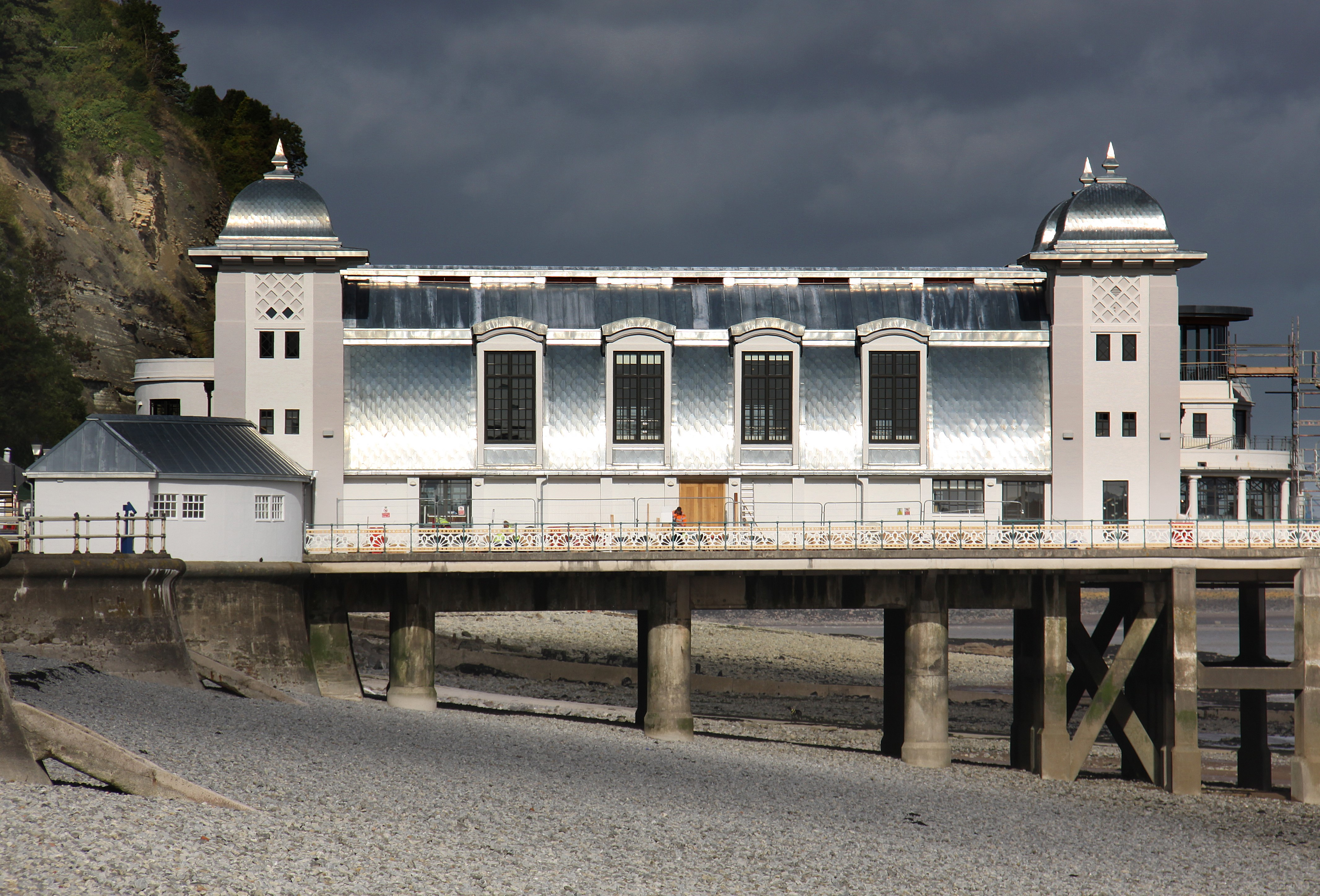
Refurbished pier pavilion (2013)

In March 2011, planning permission was granted for a £3.9 million revamp of the pier to re-open the pavilion as a major tourist attraction. The new plans included a cinema and observatory. In September 2012, the restoration work began on the pavilion, with a projected cost estimated at £4 million, funded by the lottery, the Welsh government, the Vale of Glamorgan council, Cadw (part of the Housing, Regeneration and Heritage Department of the Welsh Government) and the Coastal Communities Fund. Work was completed and the pavilion reopened in Autumn 2013.

=== Wartime Penarth ===
==== Early changes ====
With its busy commercial docks and the proximity to Cardiff Docks and steelworks, Penarth became a target for Nazi German bombing raids during the Second World War. The air raids started in 1941 and continued almost constantly for the next four years.

Penarth had its own Home Guard detachment.

Scrap metals were needed to build tanks and aircraft, so hundreds of Penarth homes lost their traditional Victorian iron railings from the front gardens during the war years. Even All Saints' Church in Victoria Square lost its gates and railing fence that surrounded the square's green.

Strict wartime food rationing meant that food had to be found wherever possible. The town's parks, recreation grounds, open spaces and front gardens of houses were dug up and converted to allotments planted with vegetables. The seafront and pier were packed daily with people trying to supplement the food rationing by landing fresh fish. There was a non-profit 'British Restaurant' at the top end of the Windsor Arcade, where families made homeless by the bombing, had run out of ration coupons or otherwise needed help, could buy a three-course meal for ninepence.

==== Military developments ====
Many Penarth Yacht Club members volunteered for the Dunkirk evacuation and sailed their yachts and motor boats around the coast and across the English Channel to France.

The Glamorganshire Golf Club, in Lower Penarth, was the site of an experimental rocket battery that regularly scared residents during practice firings. Lavernock Point was the location of Lavernock Fort, with its heavy naval guns, anti-aircraft and searchlight batteries and the town's Royal Observer Corps observation post, that sounded the air raid sirens nightly in the town.

At the outbreak of the war, over 350 soldiers of the Royal Artillery were stationed on Flat Holm, which was armed with four 4.5 inch guns and associated searchlights to be used for anti-aircraft and close defence, together with two 40 mm (1.6 in) Bofors guns. A GL (Gun Laying) MkII radar station was also placed in the centre of the island. The structures formed part of the Fixed Defences, Severn Scheme and protected the Atlantic shipping convoy de-grouping zones. In 1943 there was a Battalion of American Seabees, the US Construction Corps, living on a merchant vessel tied up in Penarth docks, while they built a large number of Quonset huts for the rapid temporary expansions of Llandough Hospital and Sully Hospital.

==== Air raids ====
One night, in 1942, All Saints' Church was hit by a stick of incendiary bombs and was totally gutted by fire, with only the outer walls left standing. The church was rebuilt after the war and reopened in 1955. Albert Road School was also hit by a stick of incendiaries and badly damaged by fire, although it was quickly patched up and in use again within the week. St Paul's Methodist Church, overlooking the docks, was totally destroyed by bombs. Dozens of ordinary homes were struck by bombs, including houses in Salop Street, Arcot Street, Albert Road and Queens Road.

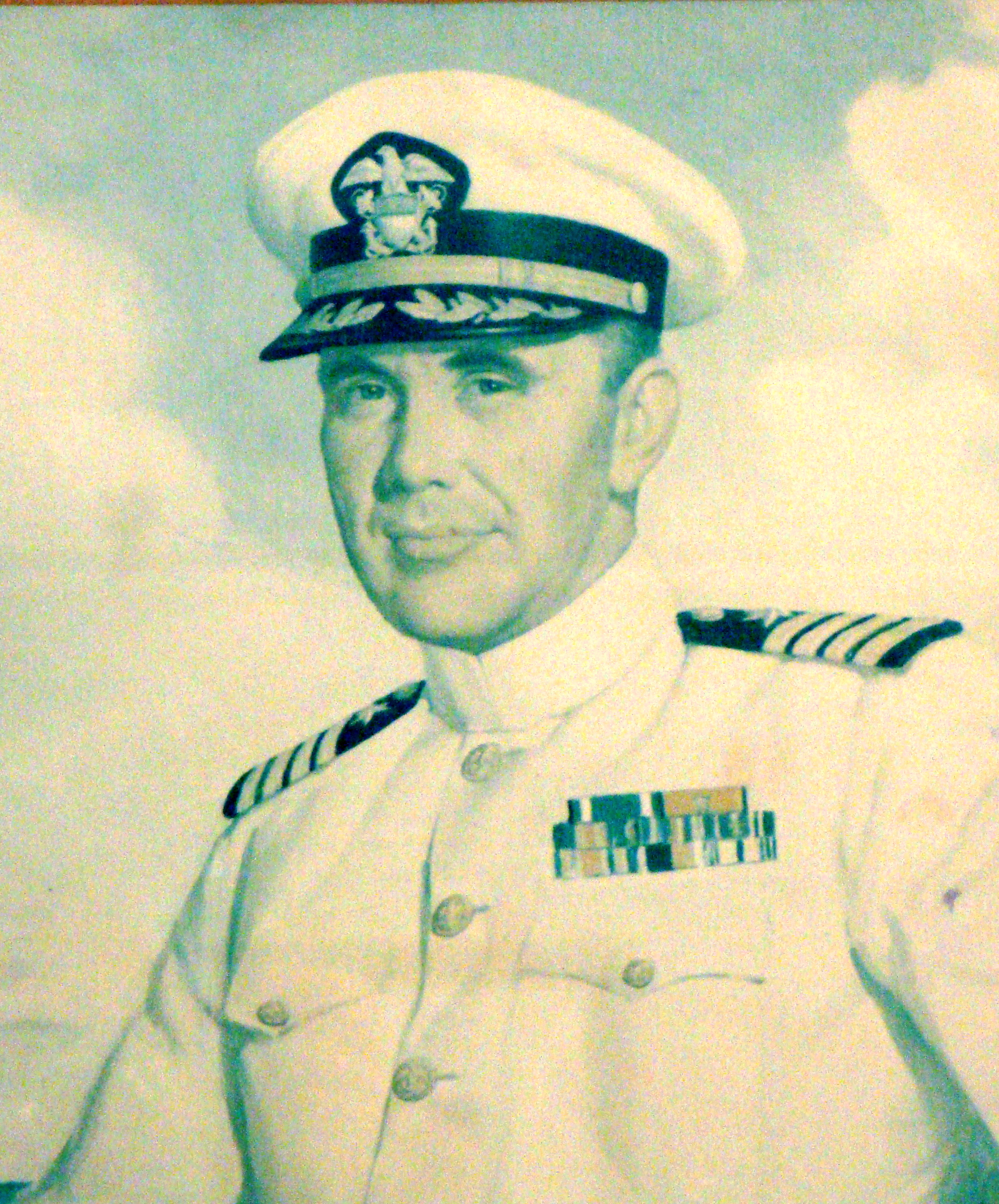
Captain A.Winfield Chapin, U.S.Navy

==== Operation Overlord ====
In October 1943, a United States Navy Base was established at Penarth Docks (now Penarth Marina) – a base from which many of the troops which took part in the D Day invasion set out for the Normandy beaches. The base was under the command of Captain Arnold Winfield Chapin USN. Captain Chapin presented a painting of Penarth Docks in 1944 to "the people of Penarth", which now hangs in town council's Kymin House, Penarth.

In 1944, Penarth dock and the dock beach, as far as the Penarth Headland, was full of invasion barges that departed for the "Operation Overlord" D-Day landings. Many of the defensively equipped merchant ships were loaded with American Sherman tanks and their US Army crews that had been billeted in Penarth after training, housed in a vast village of Quonset or Nissen huts that had been built in 'Neale's Wood', now the Northcliffe Estate next to the present-day Headlands School.

British Commando units trained on the Penarth cliffs in preparation for scaling the Normandy cliff faces. Several of the invasion barges were not used and lay rotting on the dock beach well into the 1950s used as playthings by local children.

==== Aftermath ====
Thousands of incendiary and explosive bombs were dropped on Penarth during the war and as late as the 1970s unexploded devices were still being found in the silt and sand on the beaches between Penarth and Cardiff.

=== The town today ===
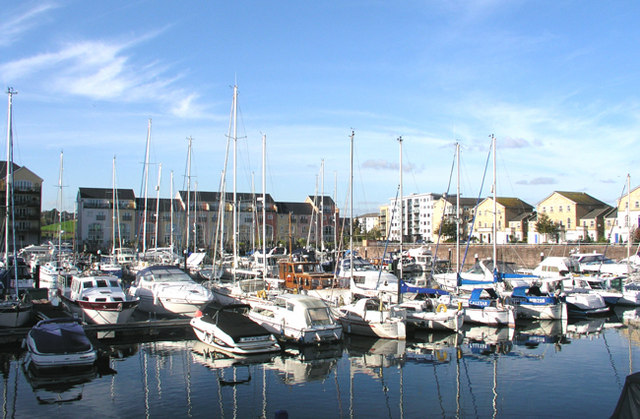
The Penarth Marina development. Pictured are vessels tied up in what was the outer basin of Penarth docks.

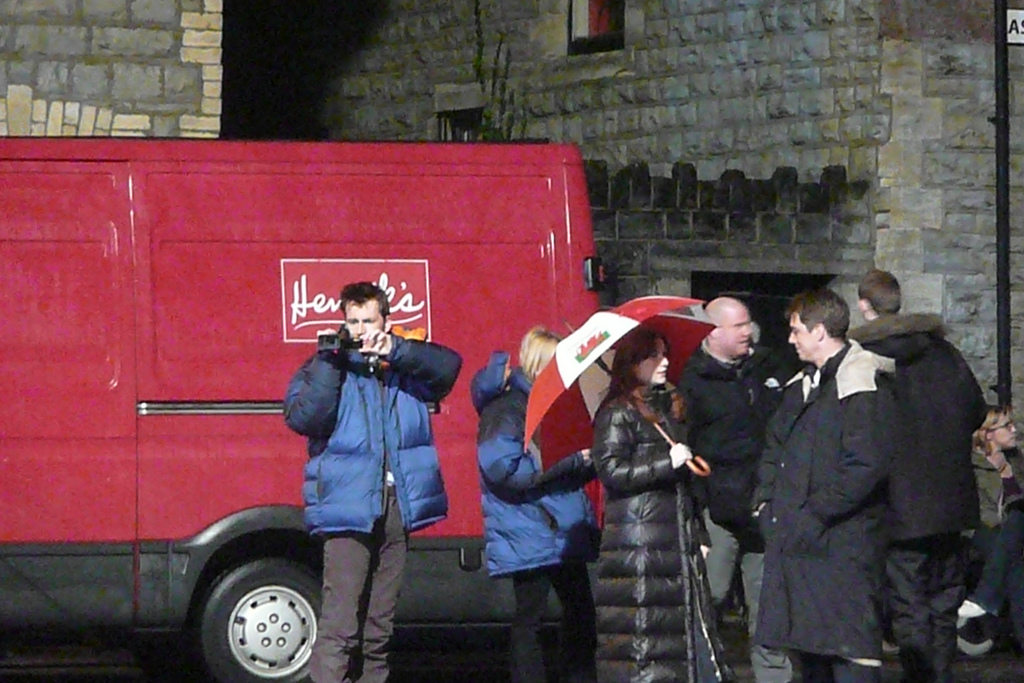
Doctor Who cast members David Tennant, Billie Piper, Catherine Tate and John Barrowman during a break in filming on the corner of High Street and Arcot Street

The coal trade from Penarth docks eventually petered out and the docks closed in 1936, only reopening for commercial and military use during World War II. From the 1950s, and up until 1965, the basins were utilised by the Royal Navy to mothball dozens of destroyers and frigates from the no longer needed wartime fleet of warships, until they were sold to foreign nations or broken up.

By 1967, after barely a hundred years of commercial operations, the docks area lay unused and derelict, and much of it was used for landfill. The largest basin, No 2 dock at the Cogan end, is now completely filled in, grassed over and surrounded by roadways.

In 1987, the new Penarth Marina village opened on the disused docks site. The No 1 dock and outer basin were re-excavated or dredged out to provide some 350 yacht berths, surrounded by extensive modern waterside homes and several marine engineering yards. The original dock office and Excise House is now in use as a popular restaurant, with only the Grade II listed Marine Hotel remaining derelict and boarded up, awaiting suitable redevelopment plans. The Penarth Marina development was one of the key catalysts to the similar later redevelopment of the Cardiff Bay area.

Penarth is one of the most affluent areas in the Vale of Glamorgan and property prices continue to remain high. Marine Parade or 'Millionaires' row', with its grand, substantial Victorian houses or modern designer villas with views across the Bristol Channel, is considered to be the finest street in Penarth, although several larger properties are now split as apartments or adapted as residential care homes. Houses in Penarth vary from imposing three storey red brick Victorian houses found on both Plymouth and Westbourne Roads to compact stone terraces in Cogan and upper Penarth. Many of the Plymouth Road, Westbourne Road, Victoria Road and Archer Road houses, originally large family homes with servants' quarters on the top floors, have now been adapted for multi-occupancy as flats and apartments. Penarth Marina in direct contrast features trendy modern townhouses, apartments and designer penthouses.

In 1930, the General Post Office (GPO), later British Telecom (BT), built its main telephone engineers' college on the corner of Lavernock Road and Victoria Road, where engineers from all over the UK attended basic and advanced residential courses lasting up to eight weeks. The college closed in the 1980s and stood empty for many years before being demolished for a new development of residential housing.

In 1965, the combined Cardiff Universities built the multi-storey International House on Plymouth Road near the end of Cliff Parade to provide Halls of Residence for up to 300 overseas students attending University College, Cardiff and the University of Wales Institute of Science and Technology. Abandoned in the late 1990s, after just 30 years in its original use, International House is now converted as a specialist residential care home.

Penarth has been used as a film location for several BBC TV series including several episodes of Doctor Who such as "The Stolen Earth". The scene where a Dalek shoots The Doctor was filmed at the junction of Arcot Street and Queen's Road. Scenes for Torchwood, The Sarah Jane Adventures (notably 21 Clinton Road, where they filmed Sarah Jane's house in 13 Bannerman Road), Gavin & Stacey and Casualty have also been filmed in Penarth. Since 2021 the Netflix series, Sex Education, has been filmed in multiple locations around Penarth including The Paget Rooms and Penarth Pier. In July 2024 actor Timothy Spall was seen filming on Penarth Pier for the BBC series Death Valley.

Penarth was named one of the best places to live in Wales in 2017.

== Economy ==
In the Victorian era, Penarthians relied on the tourist trade, which prompted the construction of Penarth Pier in 1894. Today, Penarth's high street (Windsor Road) is the focal point and commercial area of the town. Most employers in Penarth are local services but the town is also home to some larger companies, some of which operate globally, these include the AIM listed EKF Diagnostics, headquartered on Stanwell Road and the startup Wealthify, acquired by Aviva in 2019.

== Governance ==
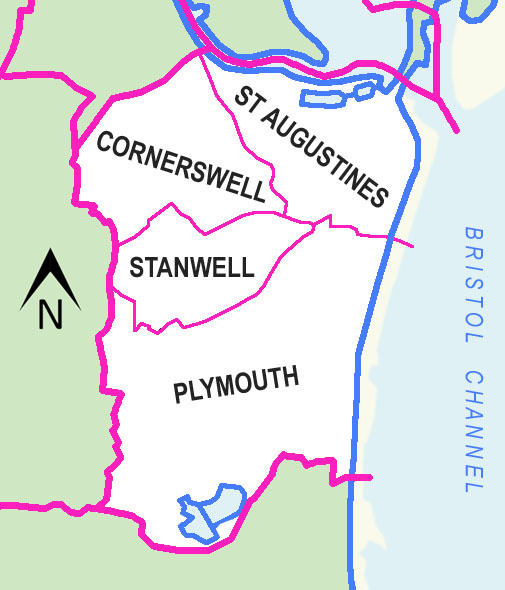
Electoral wards of Penarth

=== Town council ===
Penarth is split into four electoral wards. Plymouth, Stanwell, Cornerswell and St Augustine's. The first three are named after the key spine roads, whilst the latter is named after the landmark church situate on Penarth Head. Plymouth ward and Stanwell ward are traditional locations for professional families staking a claim in Penarth's Stanwell School. Cornerswell ward contains both the Cogan community and the Poet's Estate where residents live on roads named after Wordsworth, Milton, Tennyson and Chaucer.

The St Augustine's ward does not serve a natural 'community' but extends from the Marina development, over the Penarth Head area through the town centre and old Penarth as far as the junction of Stanwell and Cornerswell Roads. The wards of Cornerswell, Stanwell and St Augustine's representatives are all under the Labour Party banner, Plymouth ward is represented by the Conservative group in terms of Vale of Glamorgan County council representation. The leader of the council is Cllr Rhiannon Birch, the Deputy Leader is Cllr Mike Cuddy

The "Mother" of the Town Council, (the longest serving of the 16 councillors representing the town), is Cllr. Rhiannon Birch of the Cornerswell Ward and is currently leader of Penarth Town Council. The longest continuously serving member is Cllr Mark Wilson, who was first elected in 2004. There is currently a vacancy for a member to represent Plymouth Ward, the date of poll is 19 February.

The present (2025/26) mayor is Cllr Emma Richards who represents the St Augustines Ward.

=== Vale of Glamorgan Council ===
Penarth's four wards elect county councillors to the Vale of Glamorgan Council. St Augustine's ward is represented by Cllrs Elliott Penn (Labour), Neil Thomas (Labour) and Ruba Sivagnanam (Labour). Plymouth Ward is represented by Cllr Anthony Earnest and Cllr Rhys Thomas (Conservatives ). Cornerswell Ward is represented by Cllrs Rhiannon Birch (Labour) & Ian Buckley (Labour). Stanwell Ward is represented by Cllr Mark Wilson (Labour) & Cllr Lis Burnett (Labour)

=== Westminster ===
The MP for Penarth is Stephen Doughty (Labour & Co-operative Party) who was re-elected on 5 July 2024.

=== Welsh Government ===
Vaughan Gething represents Cardiff South and Penarth in the Senedd (Labour & Co-operative Party), succeeding Lorraine Barrett.

There are four Members of the Senedd also representing the area: Joel James (Conservative), Andrew RT Davies (Conservative), Heledd Fychan (Plaid Cymru), Rhys ab Owen (Independent).

== Geography ==
=== Sea shore ===
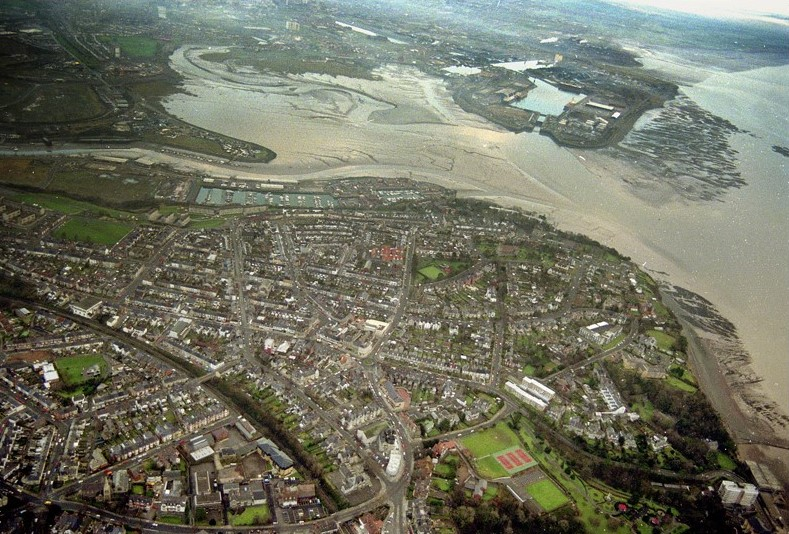
Penarth, Cardiff Bay and Cardiff Docks (top right)

Penarth lies four miles (six kilometres) southwest of Cardiff by road and has a road infrastructure that has been much improved in recent years, together with a traditional rail link. The Cardiff Bay Barrage between Penarth Head and Grangetown was completed in 1999 and came into operation shortly afterwards. The impounding of the River Taff and River Ely has created 220.35 hectares (544 1/2 acres) of freshwater lake in the Cardiff Bay. The promised pedestrian and cyclist short cut to Cardiff across the barrage finally opened to the public on Friday 27 June 2008, after numerous postponements.

An imaginary line drawn between Lavernock Point, just two miles (three kilometres) southwest of Penarth and Sand Point, Somerset marks the lower limit of the Severn Estuary and the start of the Bristol Channel, hence Penarth is technically deemed to be in the Severn Estuary and not on the Bristol Channel. Because of the extreme tidal range there are very strong currents or rips close inshore, with speeds that exceed seven knots (3.5 m/s), for several hours at each tide. The rise and fall of the tides at Penarth are the second highest recorded anywhere in the world and on occasions when certain moon phases coincide with the spring and autumn equinoxes the sea level can overspill the esplanade wall and flood the roadway, particularly if in conjunction with a high wind.

=== Soils ===
The general underlying sub-strata below the land and fields surrounding Penarth is of a limestone that was laid down under a prehistoric warm sea and subsequently ground down by ice age glaciers approximately 18,000 years ago. This produced the rich, brown and dry soil that provided an ideal growing medium for cereal crops during the medieval farming history of the area. The abundance of limestone was exploited for nearly a hundred years at the Cosmeston quarry that fed the Snocem cement factory in Lower Penarth until it closed down in 1970 and the quarry was converted into Cosmeston Lake at the new country park.

=== Cliffs ===
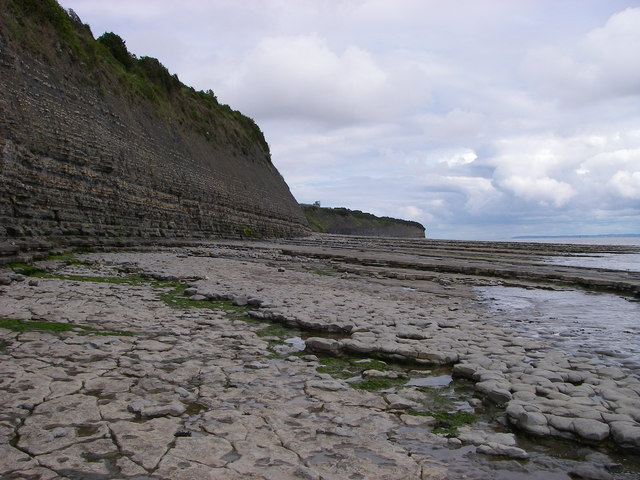
Lavernock Point. Strata formation

The town is located at the top of cliffs that have a distinctive strata rock formation that is world known and referred to as the Penarth Group of rocks or Penarth coeval strata wherever it appears in Britain. The Penarth cliffs are made of interspersed layers of limestone and alabaster, both of which are dry and crumbly rocks. The Penarth cliffs contain the largest known outcrop of naturally occurring Pink Alabaster anywhere in the world but, although decorative and highly prized by local gardeners to crown their rockeries, it is considered to be much inferior to the harder and hand-carvable whiter alabasters found elsewhere.

The main problem associated with the dry and crumbly nature of the limestone and alabaster rocks, that make up the cliffs that border Penarth, is the continuing and relentless erosion by the sea. Rockfalls are frequent and walkers using the beach should not walk too close to the base of the cliffs. A rusty sign can be seen where the town beach merged into the base of the cliff, with this trilingual message:

"Caution: Beware of stones falling from the cliff. Beware of being caught by the high tides. Rhybudd: Gochelwch y ceryg yn syrthio or dybin uwchben ar perygl o fod ar y traeth pan y mae y llanw yn dod i mewn. Avis: Attention à la marée montante! Attention aux debris de roc oui (sic = "qui") se detachent des falaises (Note: noted in situ 1995)".

The cliff has retreated many tens of metres even in living memory, with the area around Penarth Head remaining most at threat and several structures once on the clifftop already having been smashed on the beach below. A reinforced concrete and iron staircase that once led from Penarth Head to the beach, built by the war department just before the First World War, was already destroyed by advancing erosion as long ago as the early 1950s.

== Demography ==
Historical population
Year	Pop.	±%
2001	23,147	—
2011	26,783	+15.7%
2021	28,394	+6.0%
Source: citypopulation.de

At the beginning of the 19th century Penarth was no more than a village, being one of five parishes in the Hundred of Dinas Powys. It had a total population of just over 300. By 1861 the number of people in the five parishes had increased to 1,898 and by 1871 to 3,382.

== Regeneration of the seafront and town centre ==
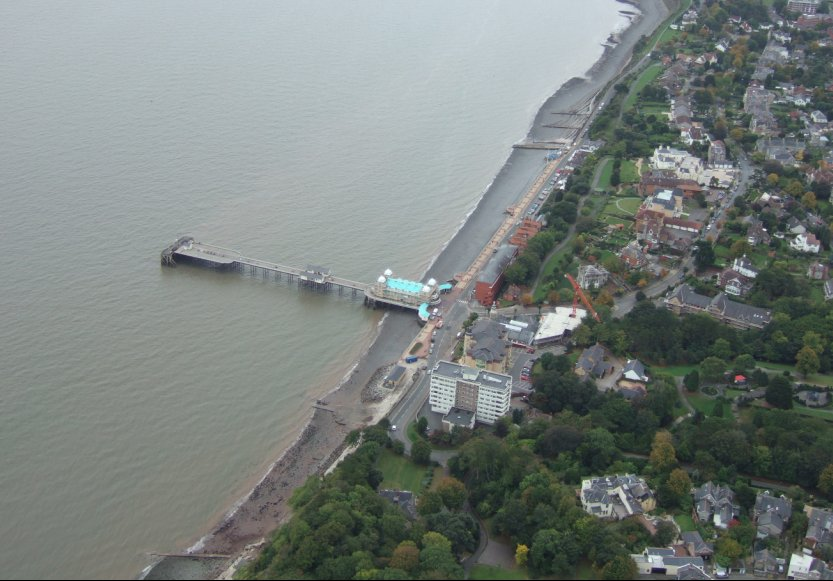
aerial view of the seafront

Despite town centre improvements, since the 1980s Penarth seafront has seen many Victorian hotels and houses demolished in favour of modern apartment blocks. The theatre and bars on the town's pier were allowed to fall into neglect and disrepair, although the pier itself remains open to the public.

In August 2008 plans for the development of the pier's derelict pavilion were made public. The two million pound Lottery-funded scheme was planned to include a 98-seat cinema and theatre, a cafe and gallery, bar and a large multi-purpose area that will retain the Victorian vaulted ceiling. The Vale of Glamorgan council allocated a starter contribution of £800,000 to enable the initial Lottery Fund application to proceed, an application that was declined due to shortage of available funds. In the autumn of 2008 a Penarth Town Centre Task and Finish Group was formed to look for a positive way ahead for the town. In November 2009 the National Lottery Heritage Fund granted a £99,000 interim award to permit further planning to proceed. This eventually led to full funding being made available during 2011 and work on the refurbishment project started in February 2012.

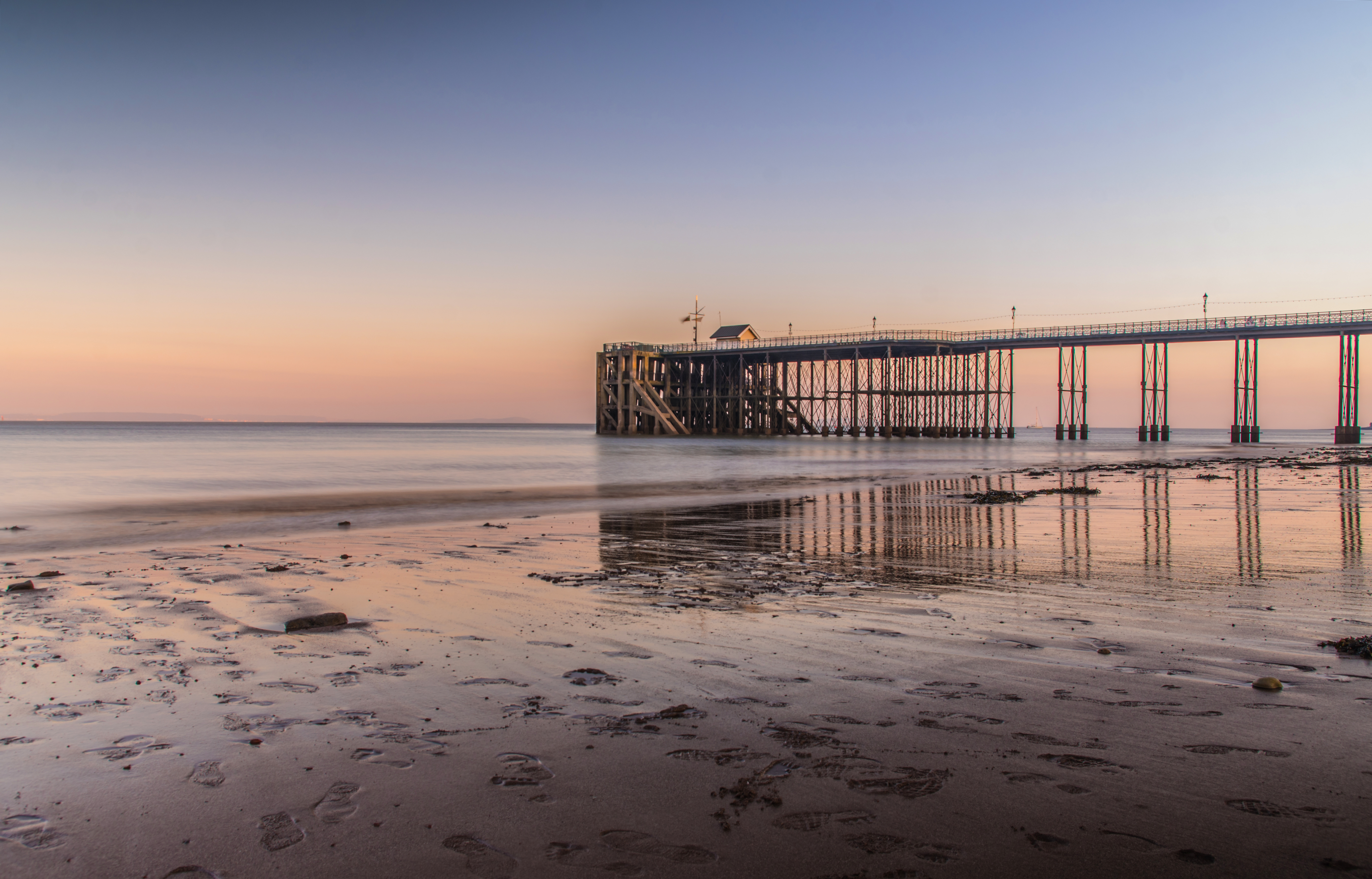
Pier of Penarth

== Landmarks and attractions ==
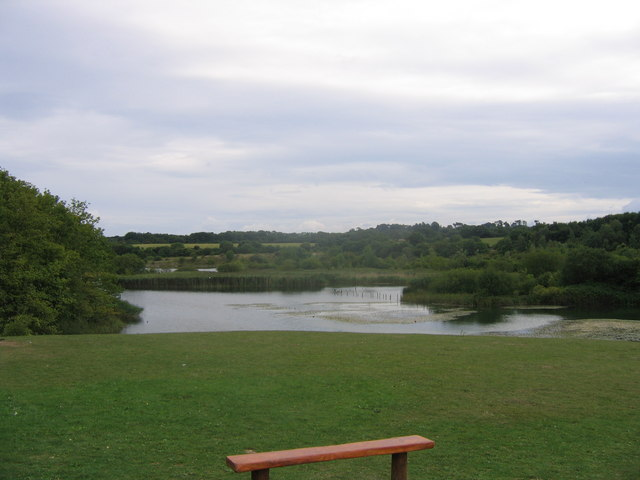
Cosmeston Lake view

Cosmeston Lakes Country Park has been a popular attraction, throughout the years since it was developed in 1970. Apart from the lake and a wide range of water fowl there are acres of pleasant walks in woodlands and on the heath. Cosmeston Medieval Village is open daily and features historical re-enactments during the summer weekends and on bank holidays. The reconstruction of the historical village has been described as the best of its kind in Britain. Turner House Gallery is located at the top end of Plymouth Road and is the exhibition pace for Ffotogallery the national photography development agency for Wales. It features regular exhibitions of photography, video and new media art. The gallery was opened in 1888 by local resident, James Pyke Thompson, originally to house his personal art collection. There is also a small art gallery located at the Washington Buildings, a tastefully converted 1930s art deco cinema in the front.

The Paget Rooms hosts dances, occasional pop concerts and plays by local dramatic societies. The 1970s singer Tom Jones played one of his final UK concerts at the Paget Rooms before moving to America. Welsh band Man once recorded a live album at the Paget Rooms, using the famous Decca mobile studio that also recorded The Rolling Stones and today pristine copies of the limited edition vinyl pressing, named (incorrectly) Live at the Padget Rooms, Penarth [sic], now change hands for substantial sums of money.

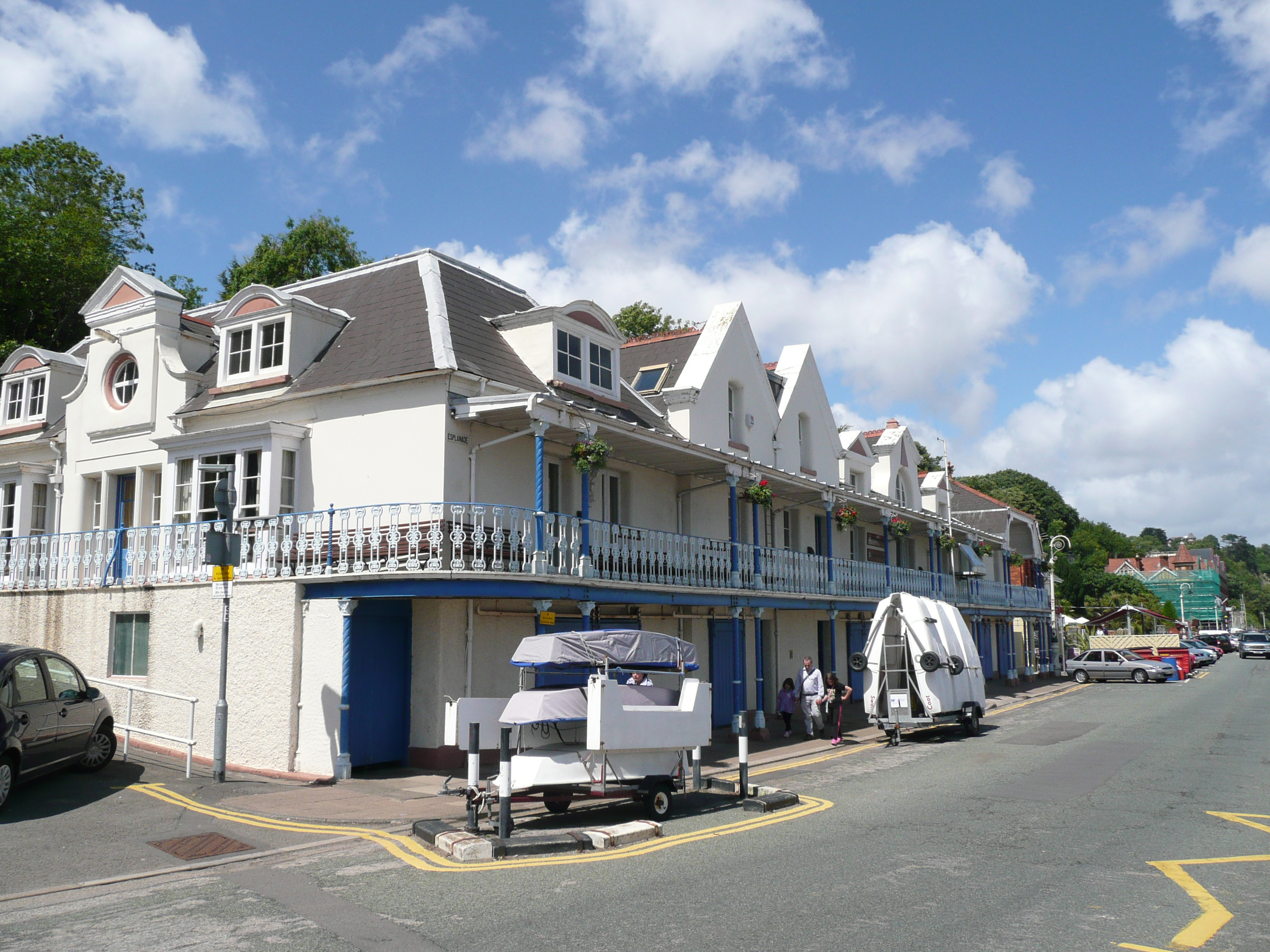
Penarth Yacht Club

The beach front promenade remains a popular draw for visitors and tourists. The surviving element of the original Victorian pier is a summer staging point for the various pleasure steamers, that ply their trade from time to time in the Bristol Channel and the pier is used as a popular winter sea fishing venue. There is also the historic Penarth Yacht Club, built in 1883, stood next to the new RNLI lifeboat station and its associated shop, together with a wide range of popular cafes and restaurants available on the seafront. The seafront remains uncommercialised with none of the amusement arcades that can be found at other traditional Victorian holiday resort frontages. The town's swimming pool and baths built in the late 19th century was closed in the 1980s and, after a short reincarnation as a bar and bistro, has recently been converted into flats while retaining its Victorian exterior.

The clifftop walks to the bays of Lavernock, St Mary's Well and Swanbridge with their beaches and the historic hut where Marconi first transmitted radio messages over open sea remain popular with residents and visitors alike. The old trackbed of the railway that once connected Penarth to Cadoxton and Barry Island and was closed by the Beeching Axe is now a rural greenway and cycle track from the Archer Road rail bridge as far as the Fort Road bridge in Lavernock. The remaining main section of the Lavernock Fort gun battery has been listed as an Ancient Monument. The Lavernock Point Nature Reserve is managed by the Wildlife Trust of South & West Wales.

The town has mounted the two-week-long Penarth Holiday Festival each July since 1966 that features special events and celebrations all over the town. These have included pop concerts, yacht regattas and power boat races, donkey derbies, parades, fairs and fetes in the parks, tea dances, stage shows, art exhibitions and spectacular firework displays. In 1970 the festival was closed with an air display by the Red Arrows above the clifftops and sea front.

=== Alexandra Gardens, Windsor Gardens and the Italian Gardens ===
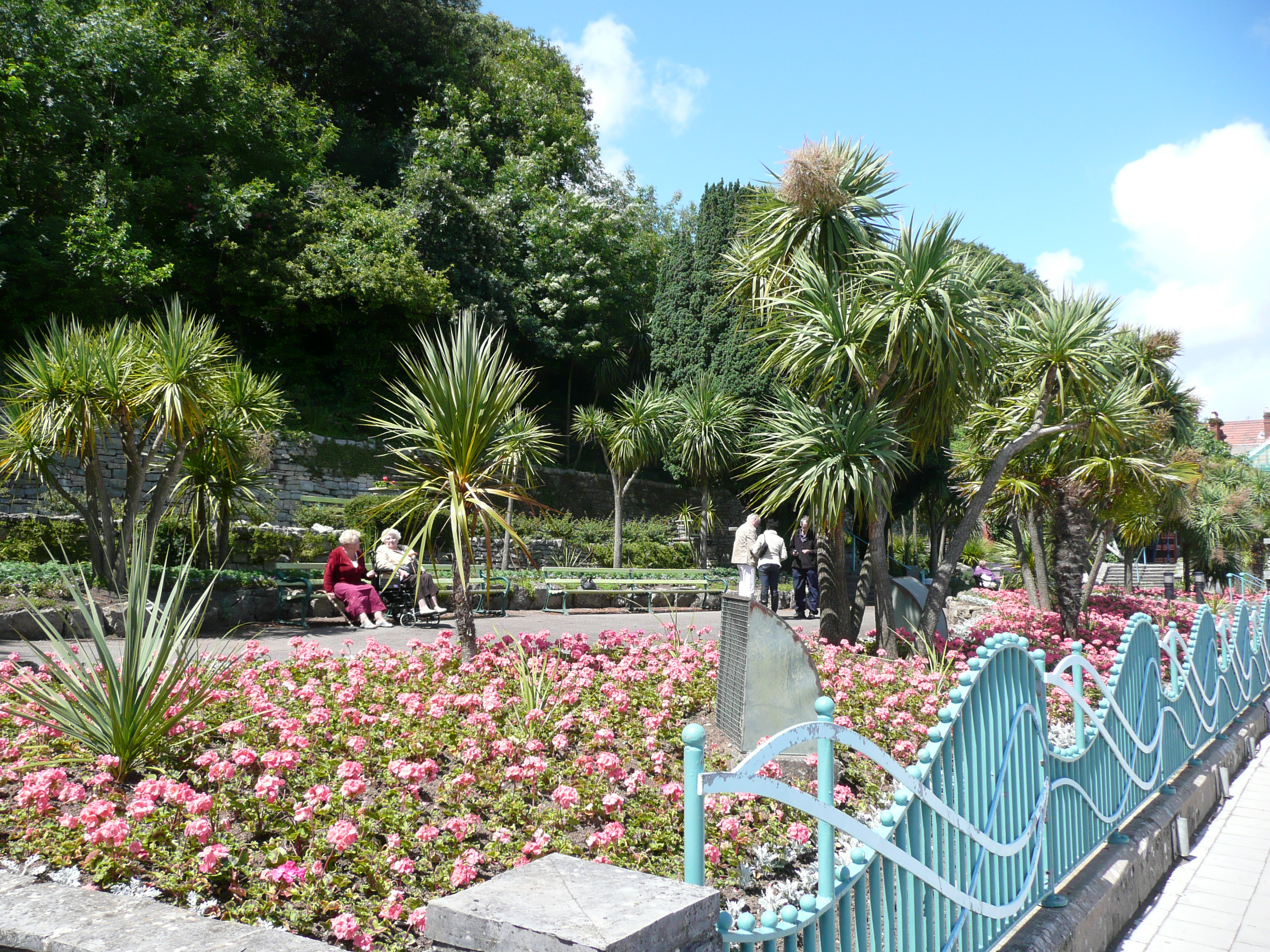
The Italian Gardens

The town has three registered Victorian era urban parks. Alexandra Gardens opened in 1902, with flowerbeds, glades, an ornamental fishpond, bandstand and the town's Cenotaph memorial to the fallen of two world wars. The park leads from the town down to the seafront, almost connecting up with the Windsor Gardens that runs above and parallel to the esplanade. On the seafront itself is the Italian Garden that displays many unusual palm trees and exotic plants. All three parks are included on the Cadw/ICOMOS Register of Parks and Gardens of Special Historic Interest in Wales, Alexandra Gardens at Grade II*, and Windsor Gardens and the Italian Gardens at Grade II.

== Education ==
=== Secondary schools ===
St Cyres Comprehensive School, formerly Penarth County Secondary School has employed a keen focus on its Welsh Baccalaureate programme, where it has led the way in delivering this new qualification, associated to the International Baccalaureate programme. Spread over two sites with years seven to nine located in both Penarth and nearby Dinas Powys, and years ten to thirteen on just Penarth, the bigger of the two sites. Work to complete the new school completed in 2012 with the completion of the Penarth Learning Community providing enviable facilities in the £48 million development. The main feeders schools for St Cyres are Llandough Primary, Fairfield County Primary, Cogan Primary and all the primary schools in Dinas Powys. In the autumn of 2008 St Cyres became the first fairtrade secondary school in Penarth and in March 2022 became the first School of Sanctuary in the Vale.

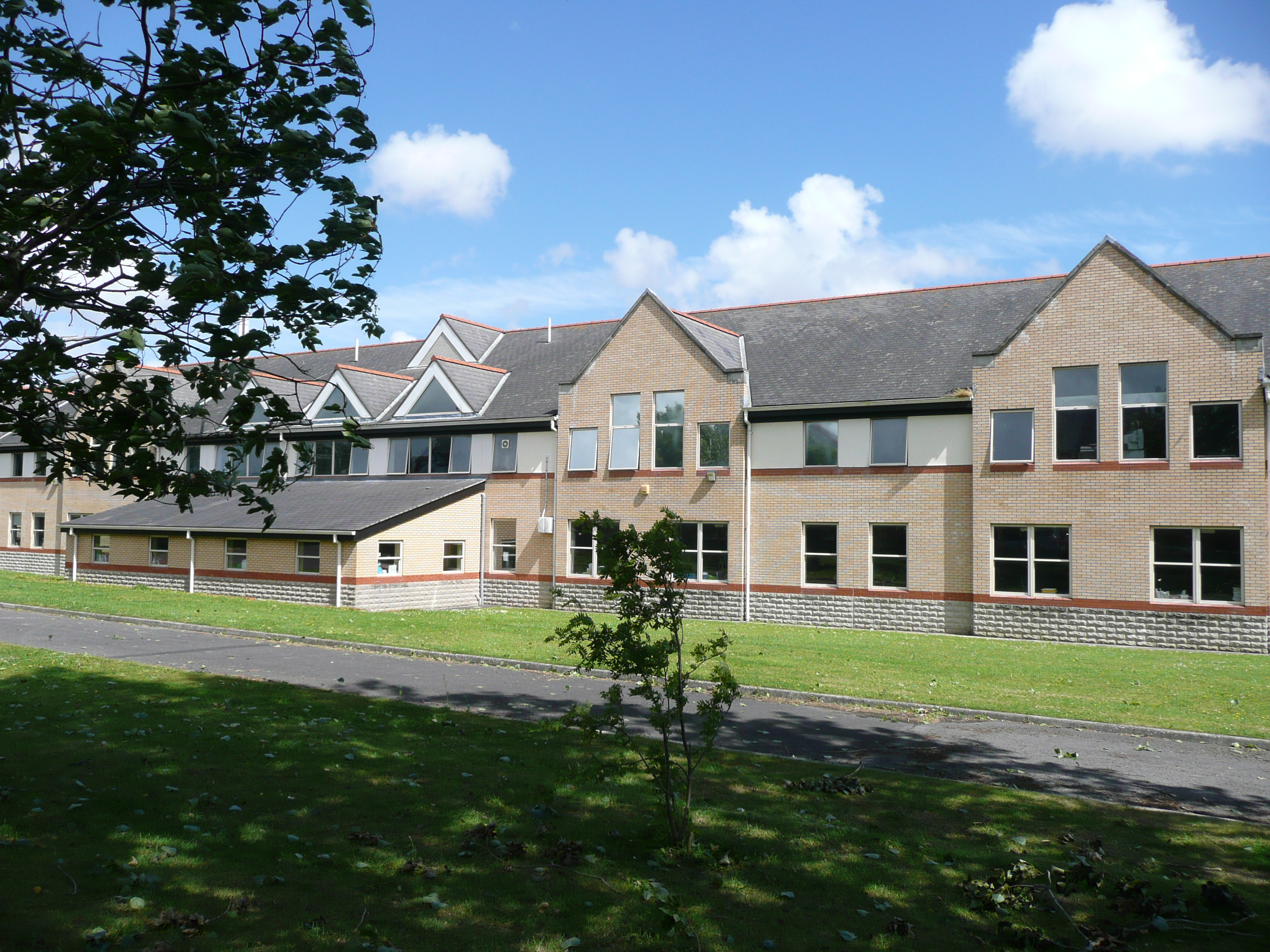
Stanwell School

Stanwell School, formerly Penarth County Grammar School, is a co-educational comprehensive school for 11- to 18-year-olds. The school has been subject to a substantial investment of several million pounds in new buildings, facilities and equipment in the last decade. Specialist teaching accommodation has been provided for Science (featuring eleven modern laboratories), drama, music, media studies, P.E. (including sports halls), Information Technology, Art and Design Technology. The school has approximately 2,000 pupils including a thriving sixth form. The main feeder schools for Stanwell are Albert Road, Victoria, Evenlode and Sully Primary School.

Westbourne School is a coeducational private school, nursery and prep school for children between the ages of 3 and 18 located on the corner of Stanwell Road and Hickman Road. There are 250 pupils on roll. The school is housed within two buildings, approximately 1/2 mile (800 metres) apart. The first houses the nursery and infants, the other the prep school and senior school. With circa 50 staff members the class sizes remain small, varying from a maximum of 17 down to as low as 9 in some subjects. Westbourne School opened its new 6th form in the Autumn term of 2008 and major building works are still in progress. The school introduced the speciality of the Diploma Programme of the International Baccalaureate Organisation. The academic results are consistently excellent with 100% passes at GCSEs in 2007 and Westbourne School is nationally recognised as a high achieving school. The school is now owned by the Montague Place Group of Independent Schools.

=== Junior and nursery provision ===
Primary schools include Cogan County Primary, Ysgol Pen-y-garth (Welsh medium), St Joseph's Roman Catholic Primary and Nursery School, Fairfield County Primary, Victoria Primary, Albert Road Primary, Evenlode Primary and Llandough Primary School.

== Religious sites ==
Local church sites are:

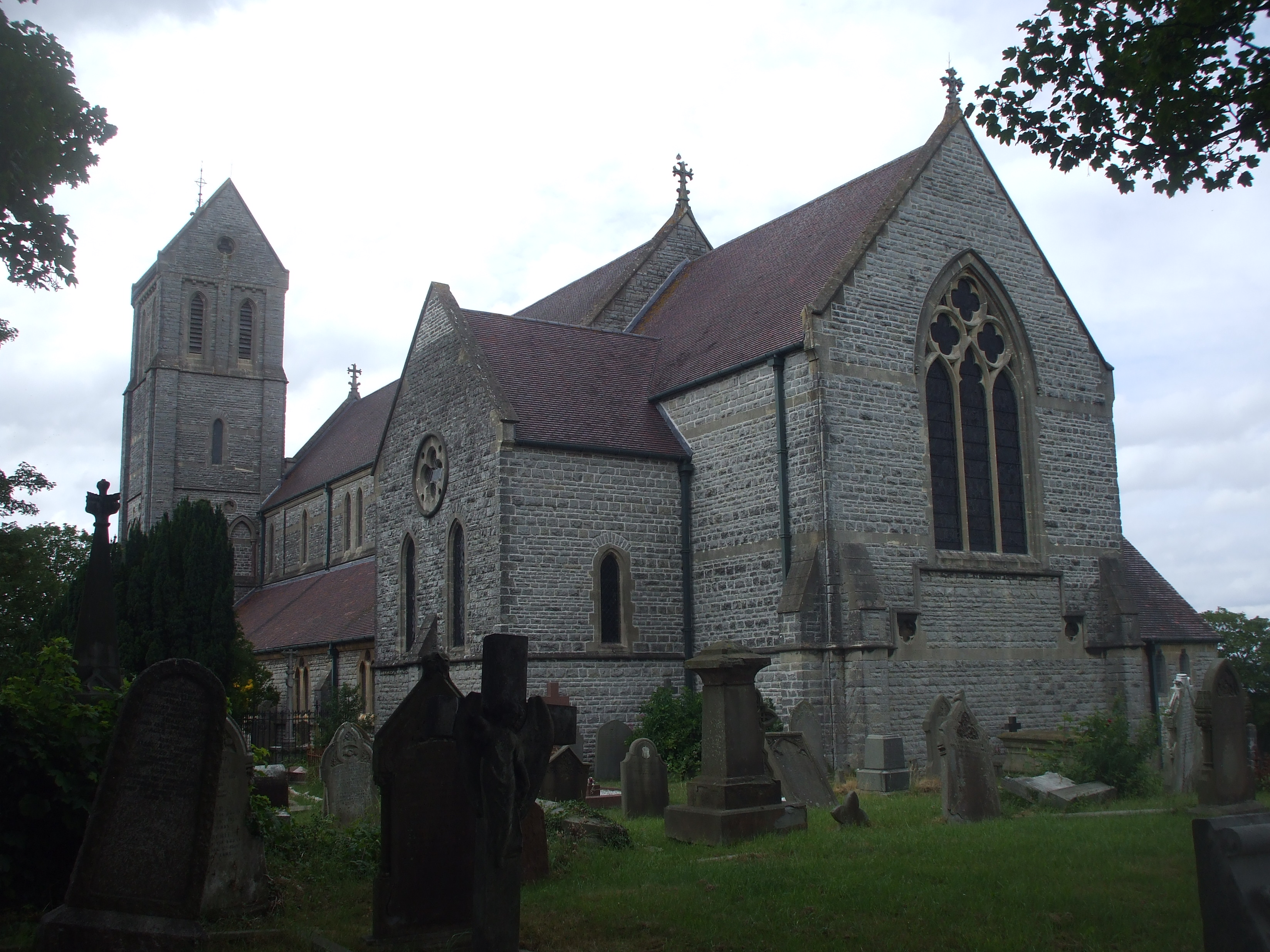
St Augustine's Church

- St Augustine's Church is just off Church Place on Penarth Headland. The Penarth parish church of Saint Augustine stands on the headland site of a much earlier church probably dating from 1240. The original church was demolished in 1865 and the new much larger church built in 1866 at a cost of £10,000, financed by Harriet Windsor-Clive, 13th Baroness Windsor. It was designed by the famous Victorian architect William Butterfield and it is described as one of his best polychromatic churches. The interior uses a mixture of coloured bricks and stone in yellow, pink, red, black and white. Because the distinctive tower of the old church it had appeared on navigational charts. At the request of the Admiralty a similar saddle-back tower was kept in the new design. The new tower was 90 feet high, much larger than the old church. St Augustine's is a Grade I listed building. The churchyard cross is medieval and dates from the original church, but is much weathered and most of the detailed decoration has vanished.

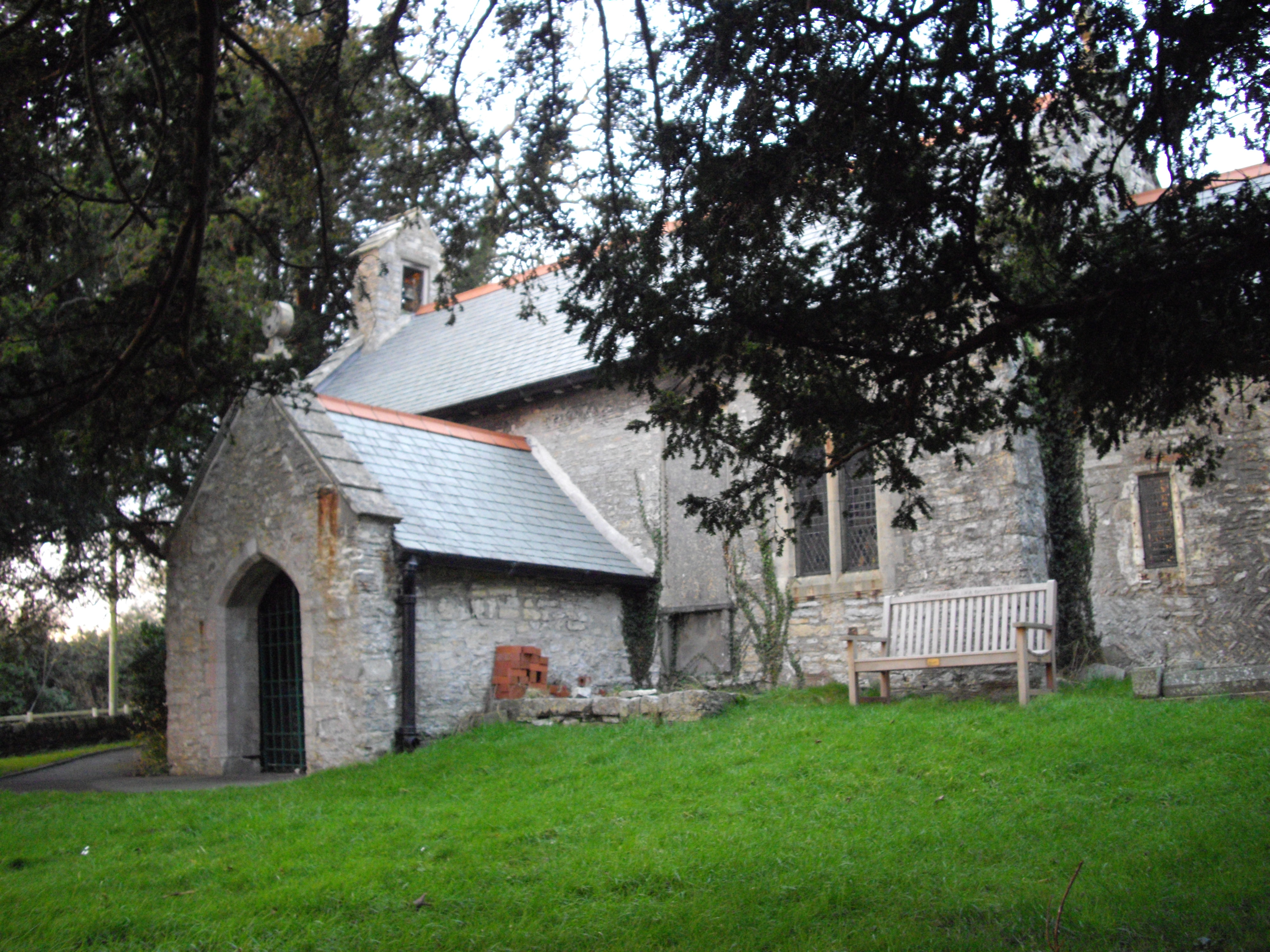
St Peter's Church

- St Peter's Church, also known as Old Cogan Church, Church in Wales is located off Sully Road and may have originally been a wooden structure built as early as 800. "The present structure is one of the earliest ecclesiastical buildings surviving in the Vale of Glamorgan and the Diocese of Llandaff. There is a reference to it in 1180 so it was probably constructed just before that of thin lias limestone slabs, a local stone, in a herringbone pattern more typical of earlier Saxon times."
- All Saints Church in Wales is located in Victoria Square. Built by the Earl of Plymouth in 1892, on a greenfield site previously used as the town's cricket and rugby field and donated by wealthy Penarth butcher David Cornwall, the church is now surrounded by a square of later housing although the original grassed area has been retained and landscaped with trees. Destroyed by a German air raid in 1943, the church was rebuilt and reopened in 1955.

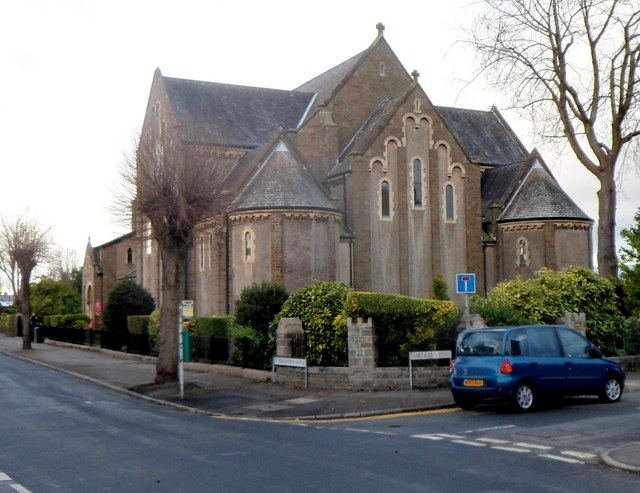
St Joseph's Church

- St. Joseph's Roman Catholic Church is on Wordsworth Avenue. The church relocated from an earlier premises in the triangle opposite the old Royal Hotel, where Arcot Street meets Queen's Road. The original church and school was built by Bishop Hedley in 1873.
- Trinity Methodist Church is in Woodland Place. The present church, built 1901 in a Gothic style, has the only spire left in the town and was designed by Henry Budgen. The congregation had met since 1890 in a corrugated iron building on the site known as 'Playter's Church' built in the 1880s. In 1896 a schoolroom had been built alongside the iron church. Trinity was damaged several times by bombing during World War II, and its stained glass windows were removed for safekeeping to the Coed Ely Coal Pit, Gilfach Goch. In 1970 a day centre for the elderly was established and in 1986 a radical remodelling of the original school accommodation provided meeting rooms, a thriving youth club, kitchens and toilets.

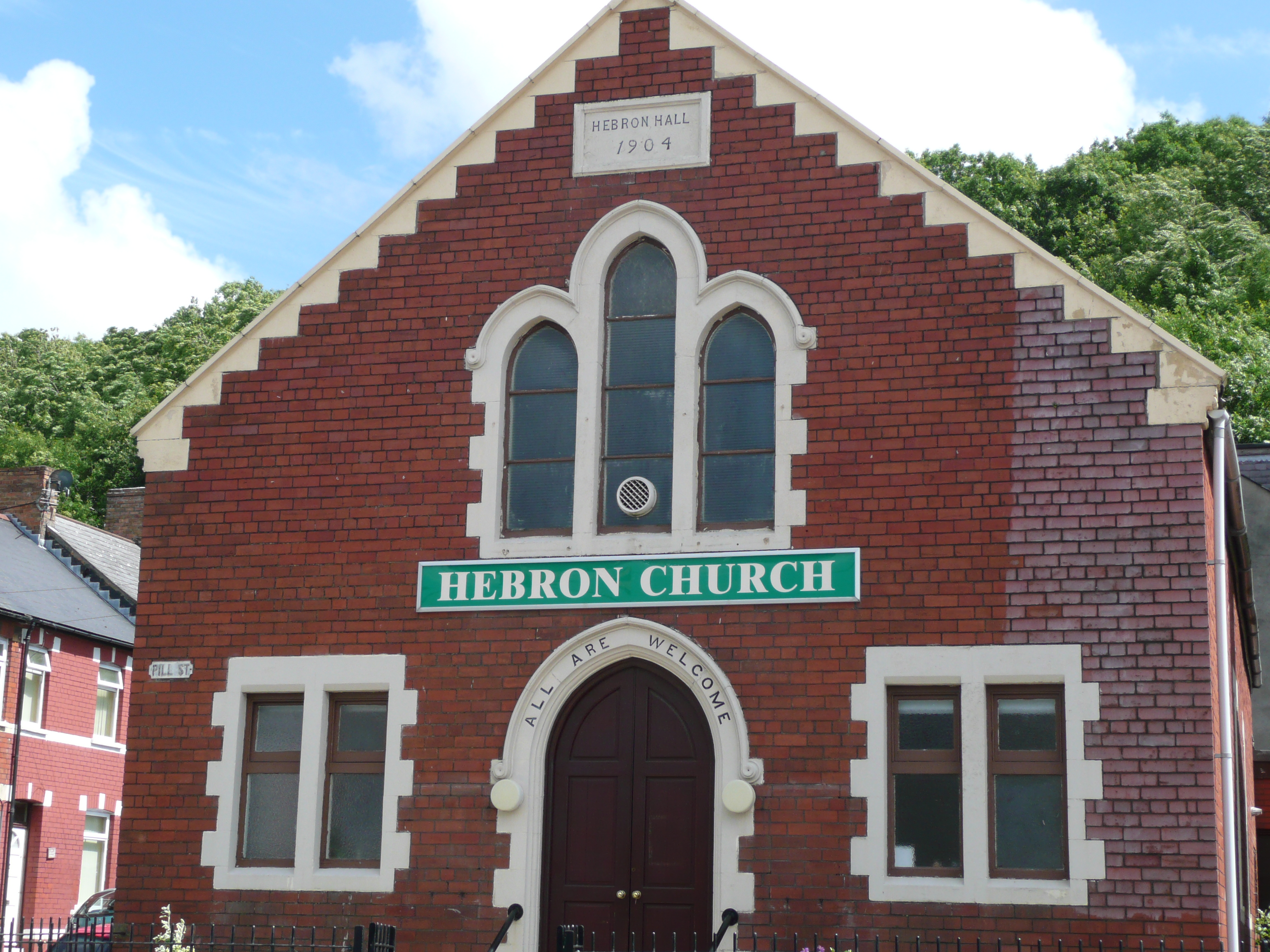
Hebron Church

- Eden Church Penarth meets in the Upper Hall of Trinity Methodist Church in Woodland Place and was established in 2014.
- Albert Road Methodist Church is at Albert Road and Albert Crescent.
- Tabernacle Baptist Chapel is in Plassey Street
- Hebron Church is on Pill Street, Cogan
- The United Reformed Church is on Elfed Avenue
- The Jehovah's Witnesses Kingdom Hall is on Plassey Street.

== Lost religious buildings ==
- Christ Church Penarth was a grand Victorian Church, built in 1897 on Stanwell Road. The library was designed to complement it. It was demolished in 1989 due to termination of the 99-year lease.

== Sports and recreation ==
Penarth has both a Men's (established 1911) and Ladies' (established 1896) Hockey Club playing at a high level. The Men's 1st XI were promoted in both the 2009/10 and 2010/11 seasons to reach what was then the best league position, but has since surpassed that with further successive promotions in 2015/16 - when they also won the Welsh Trophy cup competition - and 2016/17 to play in the Championship division of the GoCrea8 League that covers South Wales and the West of England, just two further promotions from the UK national league. The league and cup success also led to Penarth's first European venture after an invitation to play in the EuroHockey competition in Ukraine in May/June 2017.

The club's 2nd and 3rd XIs were also promoted in recent seasons, with the former now moving into the combined Wales and West section of the GoCrea8 League for the first time. The club returned to fielding four sides in league competition in 2016/17 after a gap of 30 years. The Men's first team play in North Division 1 of The Davis Wood Hockey League (2011/12).

Both Ladies teams compete in the South Wales Premier 1 division (2011/12).

Penarth Cricket Club was founded in 1851 and is one of the oldest cricket clubs in South Wales. It plays in the South Wales Premier League. They originally played their home matches at the site where the Masonic Hall now stands on Stanwell Road. The club have now played at their current site at The Athletic Ground on Lavernock Road since 1924 when the site was gifted to the town by the Earl of Plymouth and shares the facilities with Penarth Rugby Club, Penarth Hockey Club, and in recent years, Penarth Lacrosse Club. Penarth Lacrosse Club have developed several players who have gone on to represent Wales at National and International level. The cricket club operates 4 regular league sides on a Saturday. The first XI plays in the South Wales Premier League. A number of current and former players have played for Glamorgan CCC, and Wales MC, and there have been many players who have gained junior representative honours.

The once-renowned Penarth Rugby Football Club is based at The Athletic Ground, Lavernock Road, Penarth, where it played Wales' and the West Country's premier clubs until the creation of the Welsh League system in the early 1990s. It has had somewhat of a renaissance in recent years, and in season 2006–07 won promotion to Division 3 South-East of the Welsh National Leagues by finishing runner-up in Division 4 South-East. Penarth RFC used to host the world-famous Barbarians Football Club each Easter Good Friday, until 1986. This fixture was the start of the "Baa-Baas" annual South Wales tour from the team's spiritual home of Penarth, which also encompassed playing Cardiff on the Saturday, Swansea on Easter Monday and Newport on the Tuesday. On the Thursday before Good Friday, the Barbarian rugby squad would be allowed free use of the Glamorganshire Golf Club, when they would play a match amongst themselves using only two golf clubs. On Easter Sunday, the Golf Club held its annual tournament for club members for a trophy titled the Barbarian Cup. The grand Esplanade Hotel, located on the seafront at Penarth before being destroyed by fire in May 1977, would host the gala party for the trip. Penarth has a second and more recent rugby union club Old Penarthians RFC, originally formed out of 'old boys' from Penarth County Grammar School, but no longer applying that restrictive membership criteria.

Demonstration Motor Cycle Dirt Track (Speedway) races were staged at The Athletic Ground, as part of a four-day festival, on 25 August 1934.

Penarth has three football (soccer) clubs. The longest established is Cogan Coronation AFC, known locally as the 'Coro' that was founded in 1960, playing their home games at the Penarth Leisure Centre recreation fields. The senior team features in the South Wales F.A. Senior League 1st Division and their best season was 2000/2001 when they finished the year in second position. The club fielded eighteen teams at various age groups in the 2007/2008 season. Cogan Coronation players Mark Eley, Liam Beddard and goalkeeper Stewart Owadally have been selected to represent the Football Association of Wales on a number of occasions. The second longest established is Inter Penarth AFC which has been running for over 12 years with a good structure of mini's, junior's and a senior team. The club has had three name changes in its brief history. Penarth Town AFC was founded only a handful of years ago and plays in Division 2 of the Vale of Glamorgan Senior Football League.

Glamorganshire Golf Club is located in Lower Penarth and is considered to be one of the finest golf courses in the Principality. The course was established in 1890 and, in 1898, the club was the testing ground of Dr Frank Stableford's revolutionary new Stableford golf scoring system still used all over the world today.

Penarth has two tennis clubs. Penarth Lawn Tennis Club and Windsor Lawn Tennis Club, Penarth. Both clubs compete regularly in the Tennis Wales South Doubles Leagues and have junior representation in the National Junior Club League and Vale of Glamorgan Mini Tennis Club League. Windsor Lawn Tennis Club is situated on Larkwood Avenue in a residential area. It has 7 courts, 5 of which are artificial clay and also a padel court. Penarth Lawn Tennis Club, in Rectory Road, is the second oldest tennis club in Wales (established 1884) and has 6 floodlit hard courts and one of the longest continually used tennis clubhouses in the world. In recognition of the significant upgrading and refurbishment of facilities Penarth Lawn Tennis Club was recognised as Welsh Tennis Club of the Year by Tennis Wales (LTA) at its 2014 awards ceremony. This achievement was emulated by Windsor LTC two years later at the 2016 awards.

Cogan Leisure Centre is a modern leisure centre sports venue that provides the town with a full range of sporting facilities including a leisure pool and extensive playing fields. The new Cardiff Sports Village is just under two miles (three kilometres) from the town centre.

Penarth Sea Cadets are located in the town.

Cardiff Morris perform traditional dances from Wales and England and feature several members from the town. They are the prime performers of Morris dances from the Nantgarw tradition. They meet and rehearse weekly throughout the year, alternating between The Anchor in Taffs Well and the Windsor Arms public house in Penarth. In recent years the group have performed in locations across the UK. Of particular interest are their renditions of genuine Welsh morris dance as collected by Margaretta Thomas in the village of Nantgarw in Taff Vale, the key dance being Y Gaseg Eira (The Snow Mare).

Penarth Amateur Boxing Club now meets in Station Road, after the closure of their club at St Paul's Church.

Penarth Bowls Club is located on Rectory Road at a bowling green built on what was once a deep limestone quarry.

South Wales Comedy Writers Society is based in Penarth.

Penarth is also home to a Waterski club, with a slipway to the east of the pier. The club has history as one of the top clubs for Waterski Racing in Europe, producing Regional, National and European champions. With once c.90 boat members, today the club has one team that is actively racing.

== Transport ==
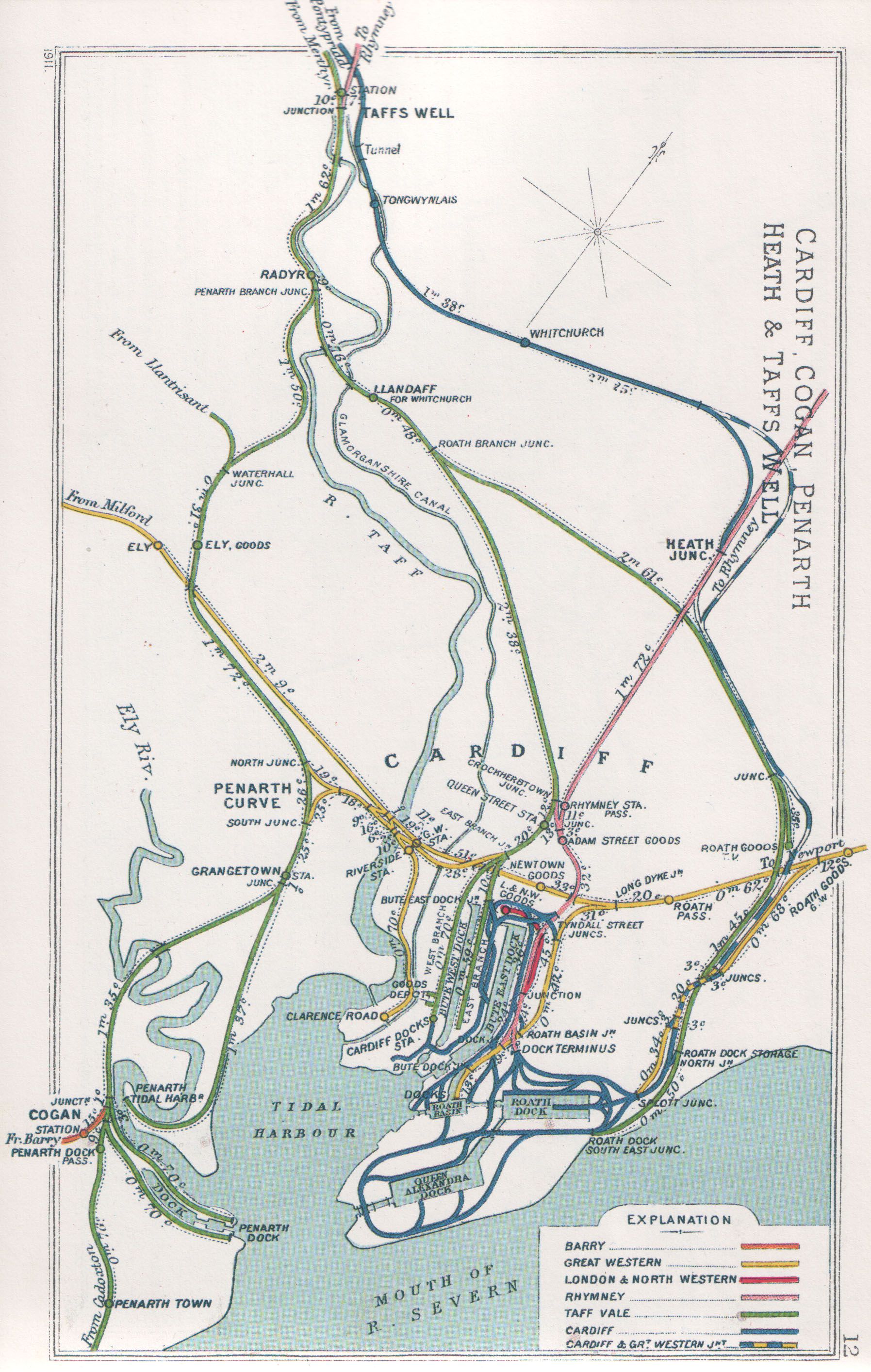
A local rail network map from 1911

Penarth railway station serves the town and is the terminus of the Penarth branch of the Vale of Glamorgan Line from Cardiff. It is on an extension of the line originally built by the Taff Vale Railway in 1865 to serve the newly created docks. Penarth Dock railway station once served the docks area, but closed in 1962. All services on this line are operated by Transport for Wales as part of the Valley Lines portion of the National Rail network. Dingle Road station is also close to the town centre. The Barry branch of the Vale of Glamorgan line passes through Cogan railway station, near Cogan Leisure Centre.

Penarth is served by Cardiff Bus services from Cardiff City Centre, with some services continuing to Barry. Penarth falls into the Cardiff fare zone for Cardiff Bus fares. Penarth is also served by First Cymru from Cardiff City Centre - Llandough which continues on to Barry.

Penarth is linked to west Somerset and North Devon seaside resorts such as Minehead, Ilfracombe and Lundy Island by the Paddle Steamer Waverley and MV Balmoral, which have sailed from Penarth pier for over 60 years, continuing a steamer tradition that started when the pier was built. Devon's tourist trade in the late 19th century was expanded when the paddle steamers spent weekends cruising the Bristol Channel taking the South Wales tourists on cheap excursions from Penarth to places such as Lynmouth, Ilfracombe, Bideford and Clovelly. The traditional summer daily service to Weston-super-mare ceased in 1994 when Weston's Birnbeck Pier was damaged in a storm, declared unsafe and closed to visitors.

The Cardiff Waterbus operates a passenger water taxi service daily between 10.30 am and 5.00 pm, sailing from the Penarth end of the Bay Barrage and the Mermaid Quay on Cardiff's waterfront with seven crossings at hourly intervals. The first boat leaves Penarth at 10.30 am and the last boat back departs Cardiff at 5.00 pm.

The Pont y Werin pedestrian and cycle bridge opened in July 2010, completing a 4 1/4-mile (7-kilometre) circular route between Cardiff Bay and Penarth.

== Overseas connections ==
The town shares its name with Penarth, Delaware in the US.

Penarth is twinned with:

- Saint-Pol-de-Léon Brittany, France. The fortieth anniversary of the twinning charter took place in 2010. In the 1970s and 1980s there were regular joint civic meetings and events often in conjunction with Penarth Holiday Fortnight, coupled with annual student exchange weeks between the two towns of up to fifty young people. Since 2003 when the French town's long serving mayor retired and there were changes to their committee no cultural exchanges or joint civic events have taken place. In March 2010 it was announced that both towns were keen to reconnect and an appeal was made for local organisations and interested individuals to become actively involved. In Penarth marina there is an address named after the twinned town, "Plas St. Pol De Leon".

== Notable people ==
See Category:People from Penarth

Those who have either been born, lived in, or associated with Penarth have included politicians such as Plaid Cymru founder Saunders Lewis, James Childs Gould MP, Alun Michael MP, John Smith MP, and three recipients of the Victoria Cross, including Dambuster's leader Guy Gibson.

Sports stars associated with Penarth include Colin Jackson, Dame "Tanni" Grey-Thompson, Spanish handball player Aitor Ariño Bengoechea, and professional rugby union player Louis Rees-Zammit.

Penarth is associated with a number of people in the performing arts, including novelist Eric Linklater, actor Colin McCormack, actor Ronan Vibert, actress Morfydd Clark, actress Erin Richards, composer Joseph Parry, French Impressionist painter Alfred Sisley, singer-songwriter Jem, singer-songwriter Shakin' Stevens, and drum'n'bass producer Lincoln Barrett (also known as High Contrast) and singer-songwriter Martyn Joseph.

== Gallery ==
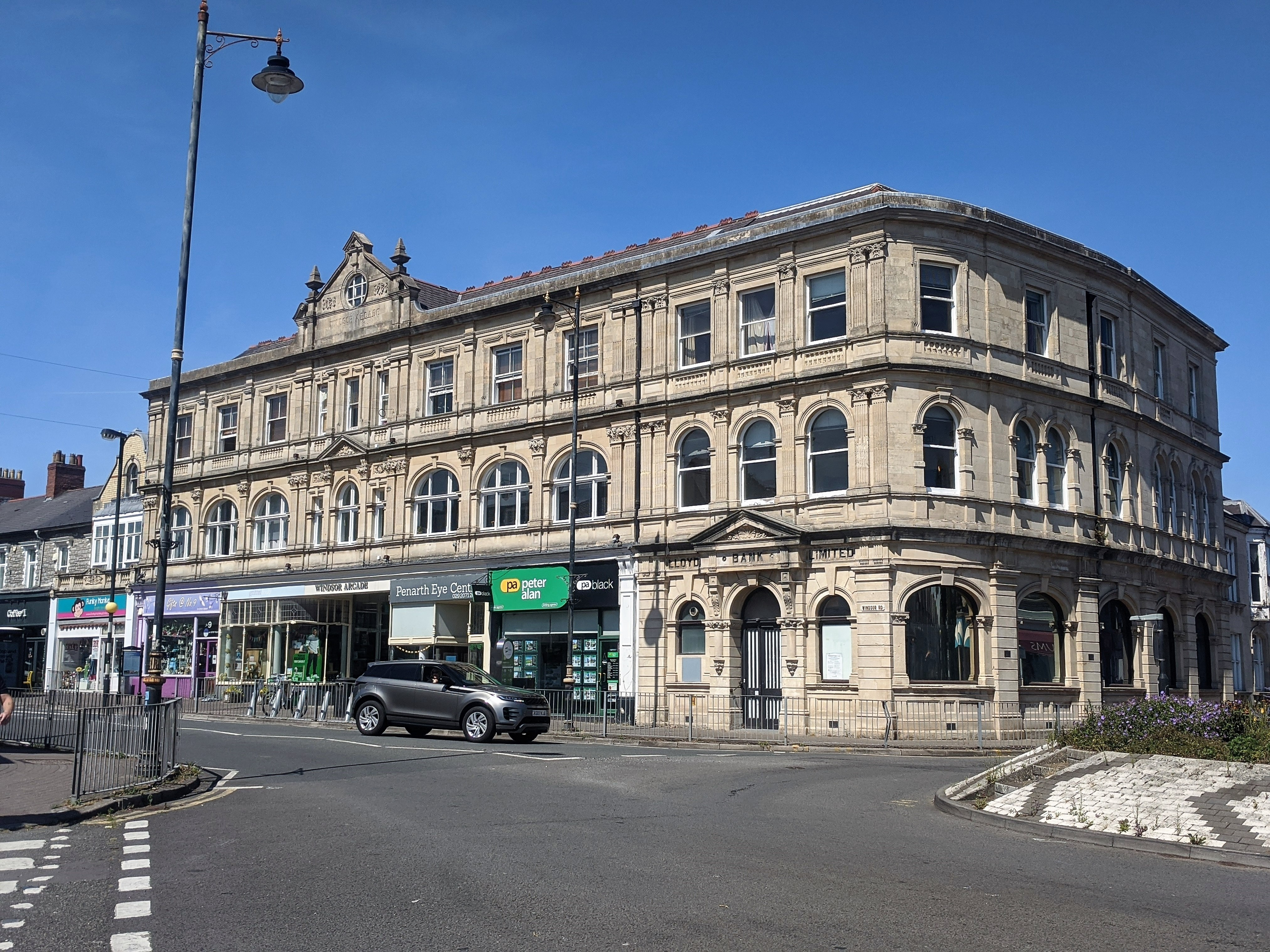
The late Victorian Windsor Arcade

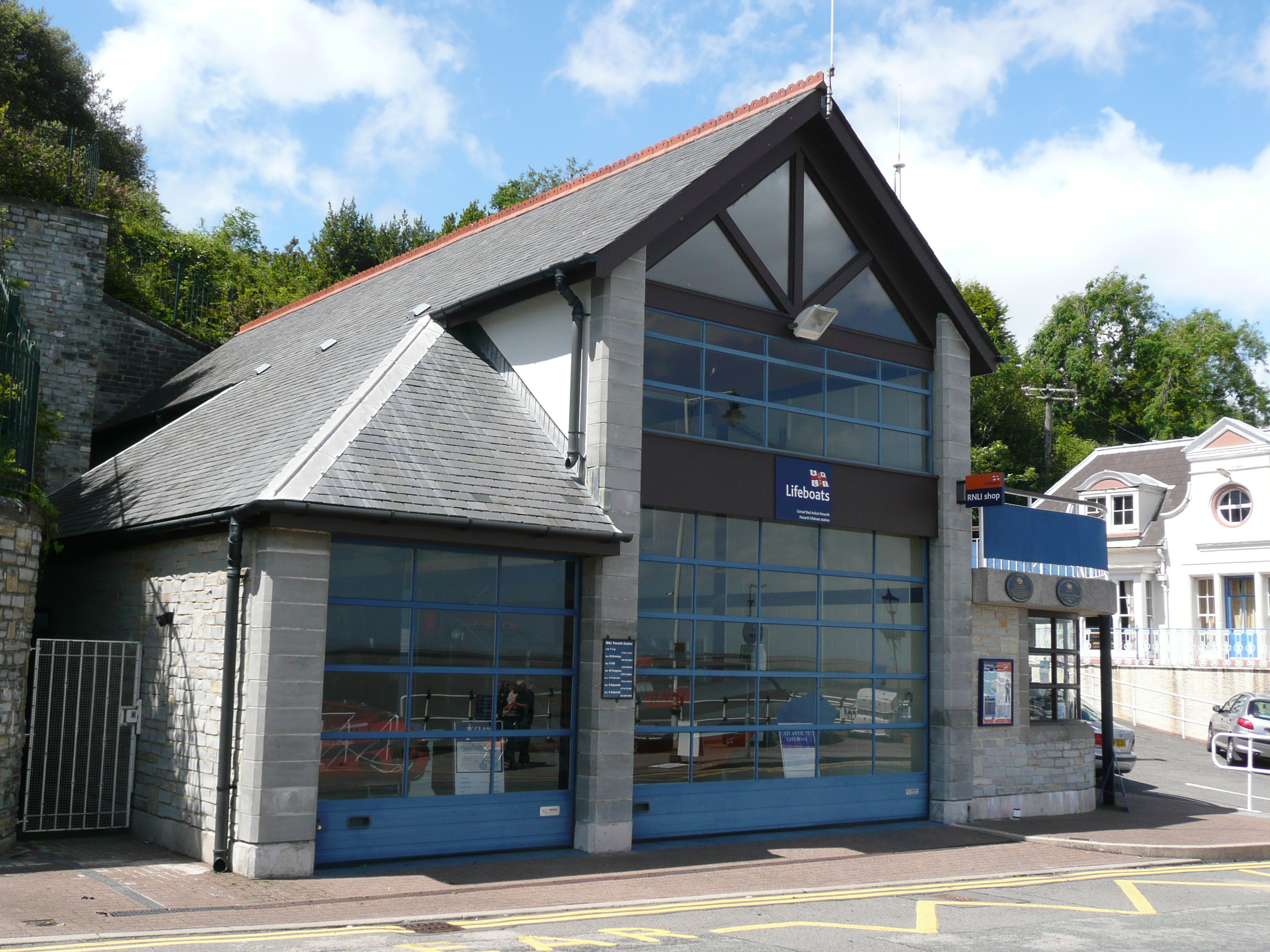
Penarth Lifeboat Station

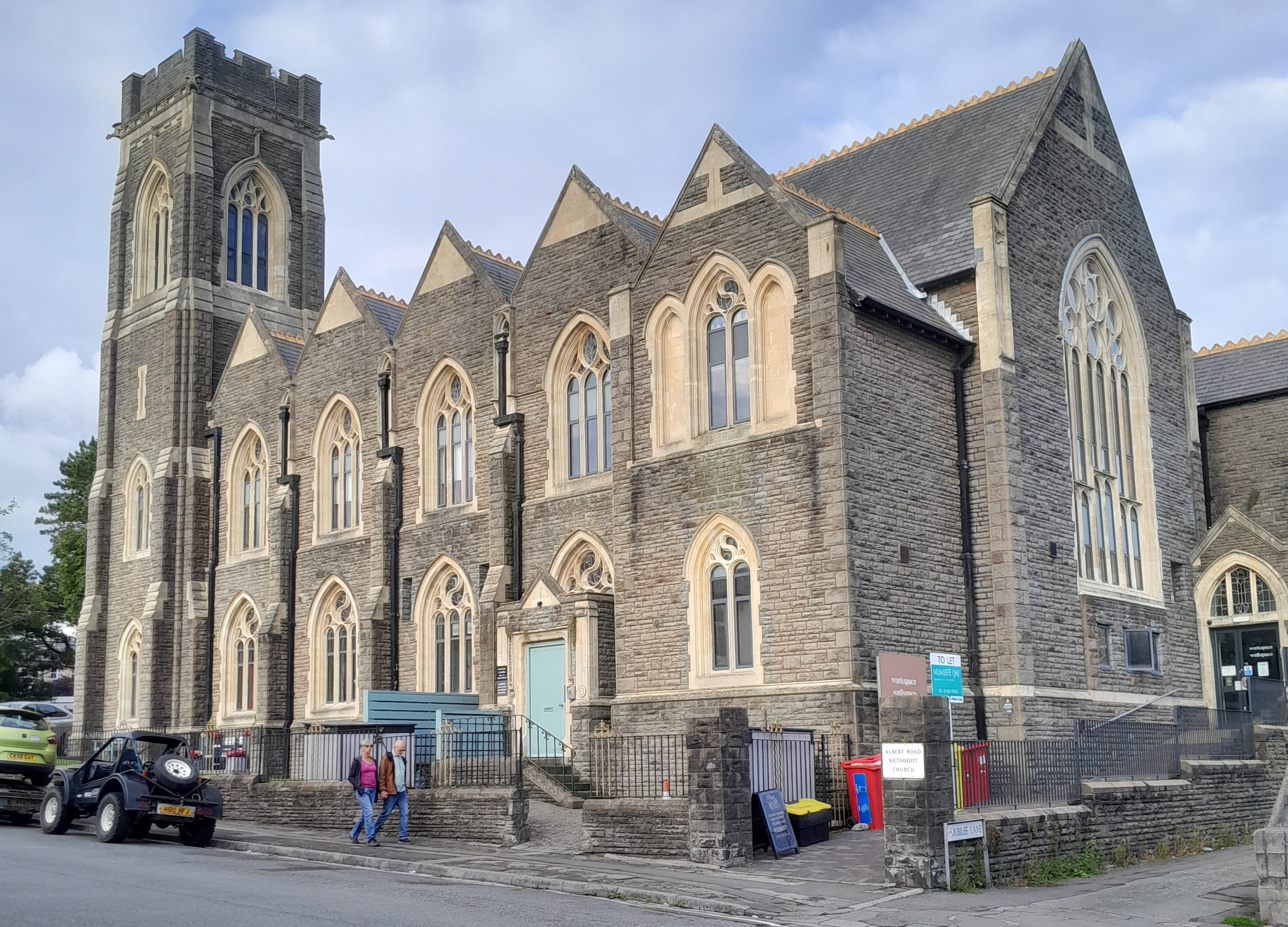
Albert Road Methodist Church

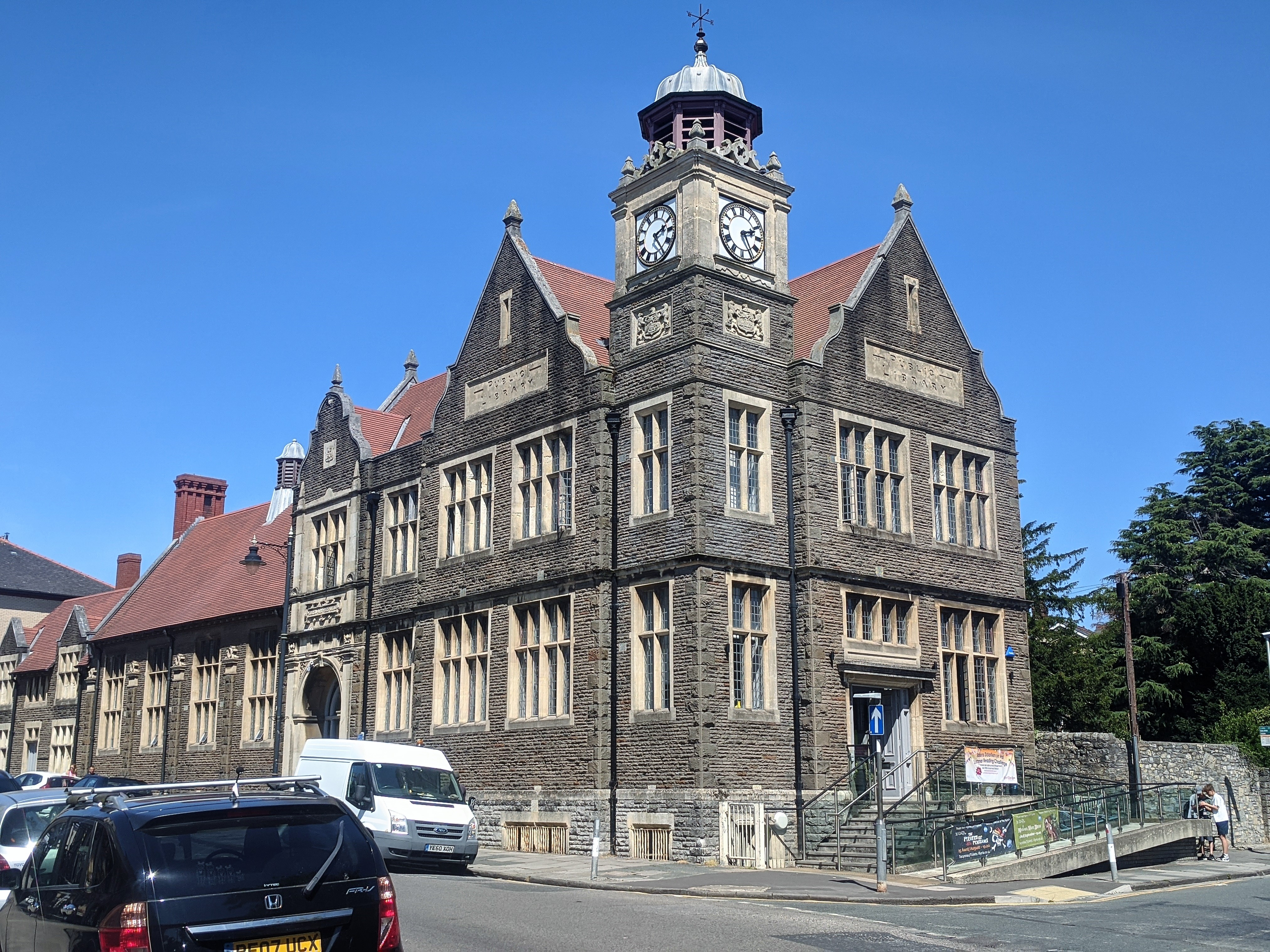
Penarth Library

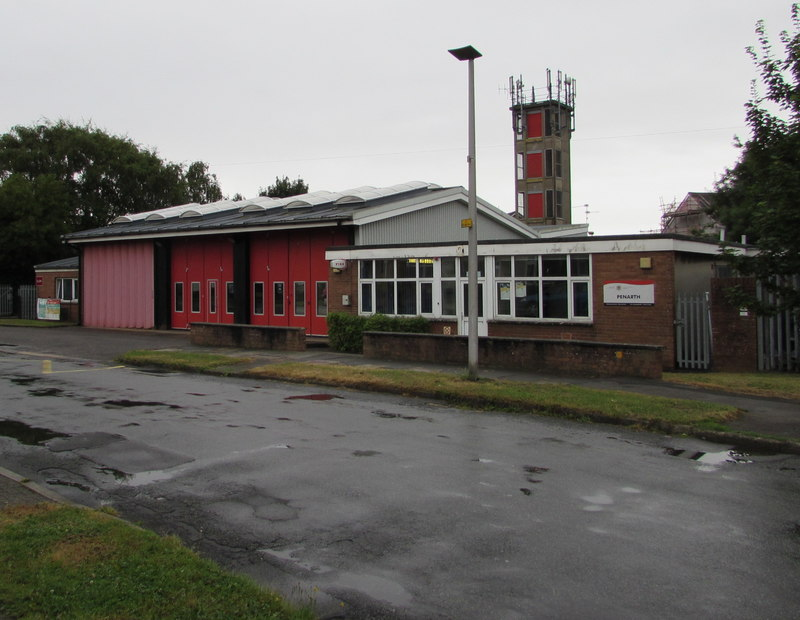
Penarth Fire Station

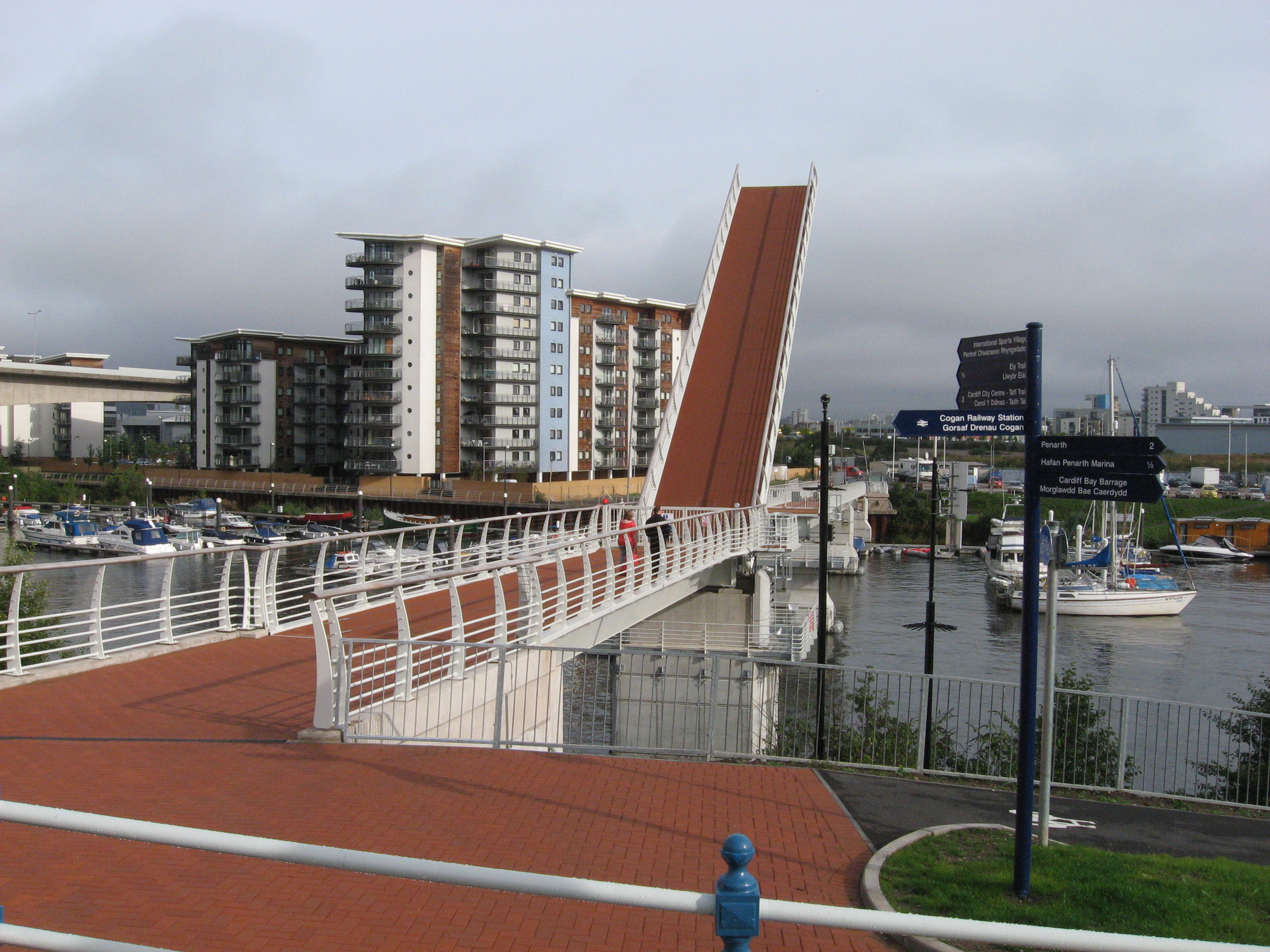
Pont y Werin footbridge spanning the River Ely

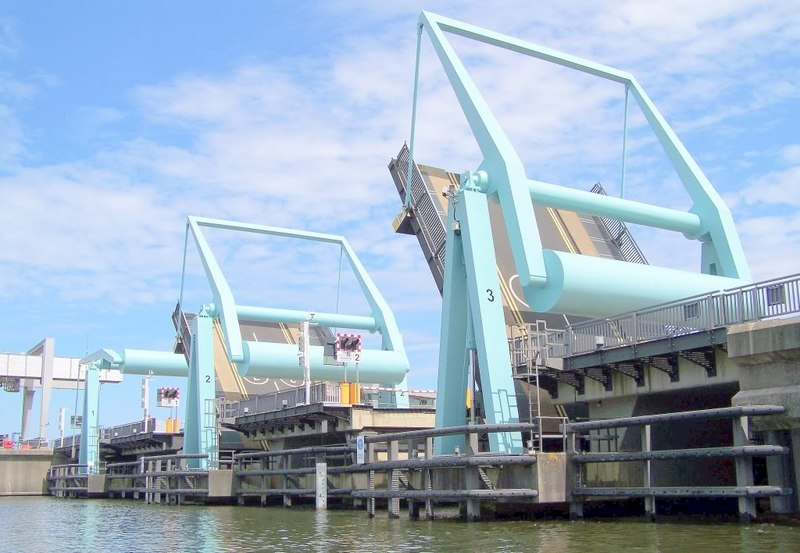
Cardiff Bay Barrage

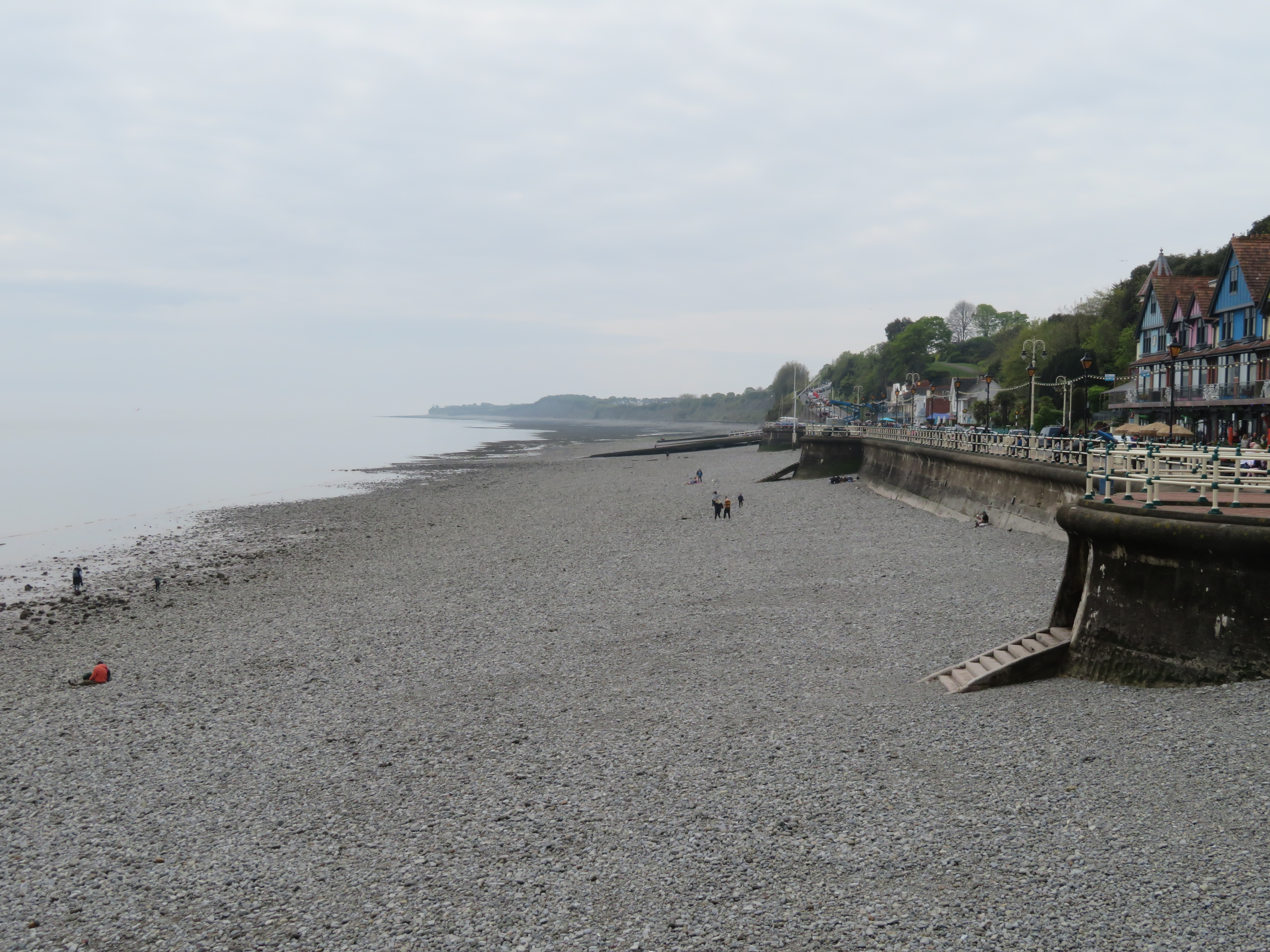
Penarth Beach

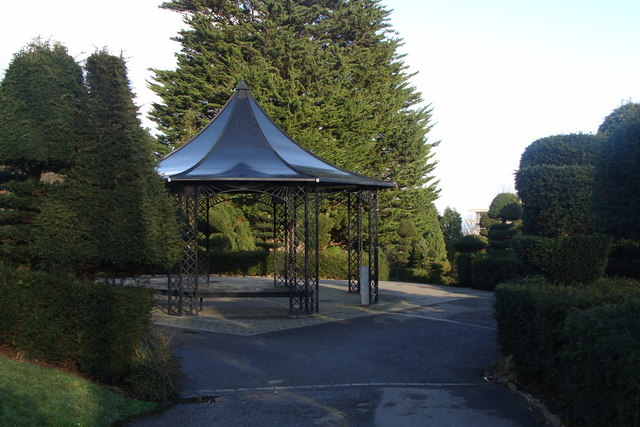
The bandstand in Alexandra Park

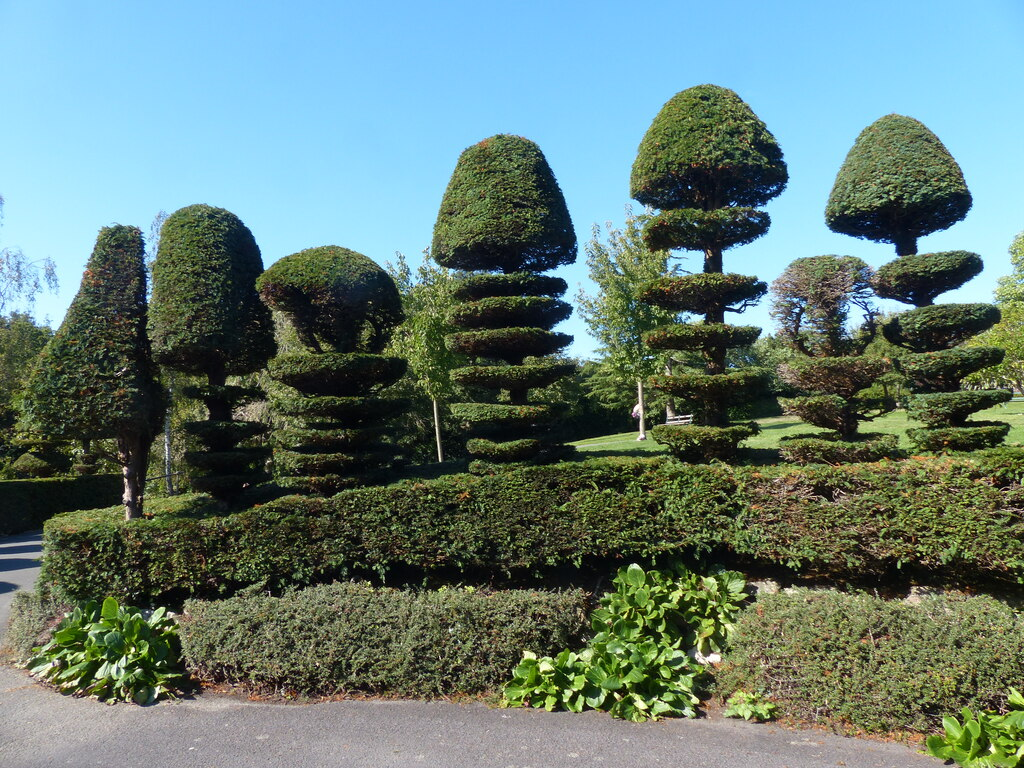
Alexandra Park

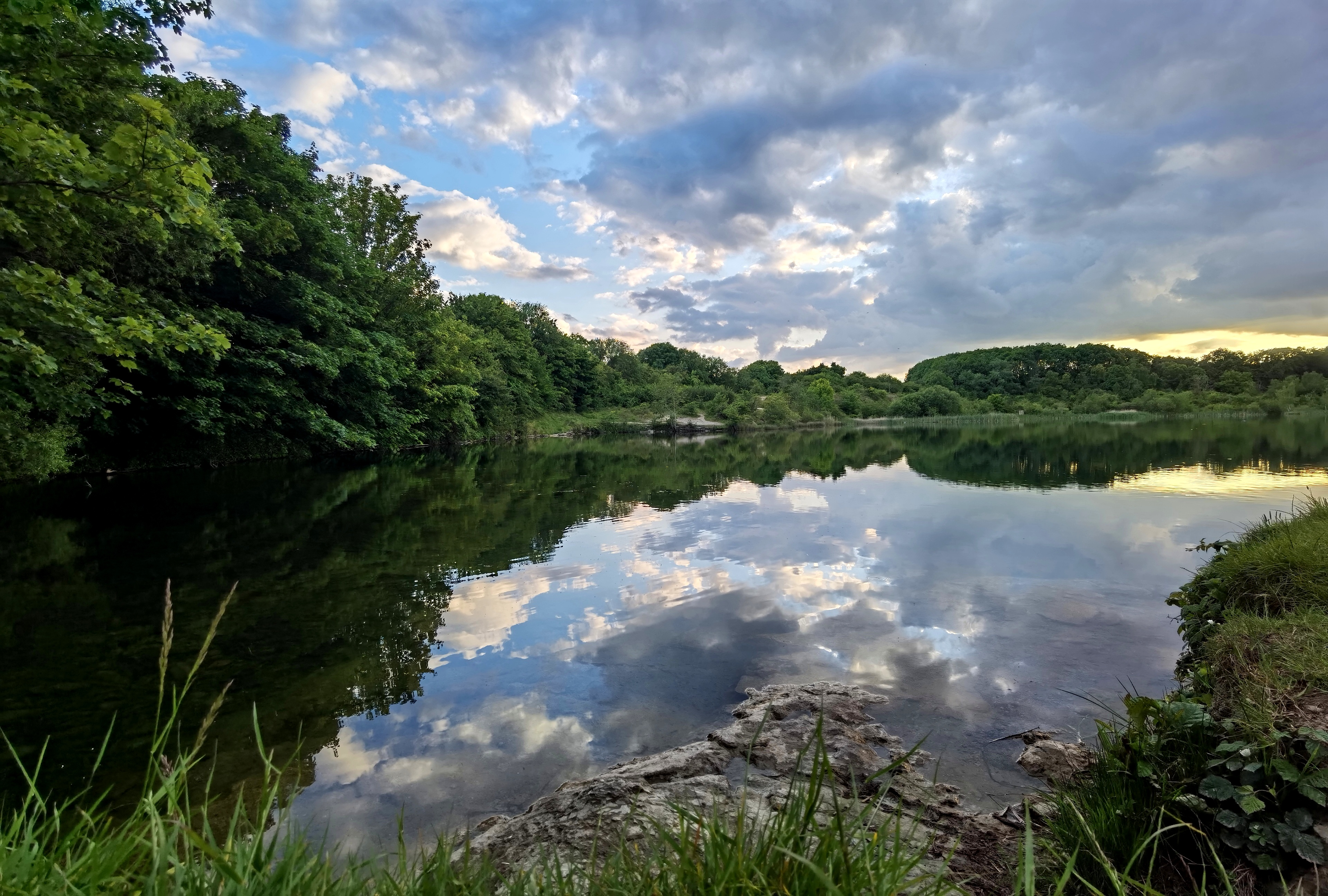
Cosmeston Lakes Country Park

Cosmeston Medieval Village

== See also ==
- Cogan
- Lavernock
- List of people associated with Penarth
- Listed buildings in Penarth
- Penarth Lifeboat Station
