= Cosmeston Medieval Village =

- Location within the Vale of Glamorgan
- Location: Penarth, Vale of Glamorgan, Wales
- Coordinates: 51.4134°N 3.1839°W
- Type: Living history museum
- Owner: Vale of Glamorgan Council
- Website: Cosmeston Medieval Village

Cosmeston Medieval Village is a living history medieval village near Lavernock in the Vale of Glamorgan, Wales. Based upon remains discovered during a 1980s archaeological dig in the grounds of Cosmeston Lakes Country Park, it is a re-creation of 14th century peasant life in Wales in the Late Middle Ages.

Groups of reenactors regularly perform at the site, camping in tents around the outskirts of the village, and performing displays of historical combat for the public.

== History ==
=== Early medieval ===
The original Cosmeston village grew around a fortified manor house constructed sometime around the 12th century by the De Costentin family, who were among the first Norman invaders of Wales in the early 12th century following William the Conqueror's invasion of neighbouring England in 1066. It is unlikely that the manor house at the site was a substantial building and there is documentary evidence that by 1437 the manor house had already fallen into total ruin. The village would have consisted of a number of small stone round houses, or crofts, with thatched roofs, as depicted in the current reconstruction, and the village population would have been between 50 and 100 people at most, including children.

The de Costentin family originated on the Cotentin peninsula in northern France. They were the first lords of the manor and they called the village Costentinstune, which over time became known as Cosmeston. They built the original manor house and, perhaps, a few dwellings or small farms, but for the next two centuries it appears that little further development occurred.

=== Later medieval period ===
Around 1316 the manor passed into the hands of the de Caversham family, also of Norman descent.

The buildings that have been excavated so far seem to be from the 14th century. It would appear that the de Caversham family brought a more designed approach to the development of the community and a better regulated and more compact settlement began to develop during their stewardship of the village.

There is little sign that the village continued to develop much past the Late Middle Ages. Unusually, no Norman church was ever established in the immediate area, so by 1824 all that remained of Cosmeston village were four isolated crofts and the Little Cosmeston Farmhouse as shown on the Marquis of Bute's detailed maps of the time. It is possible that the majority of the villagers were wiped out during the Black Death plague of the 1340s or the later outbreaks, leaving Cosmeston a Deserted medieval village.

In addition to the plague, the villagers would have had to combat other difficulties. The land is low-lying and at the mercy of the many water sources that now feed the Cosmeston Lake. There is substantial evidence of drainage dykes, but even they would have struggled to keep the arable land free from waterlogging and constant flooding. Additionally the period was one of permanent political upheaval with intermittent resistance and armed conflict between several local Welsh leaders. In January 1316, for instance, Llywelyn Bren attacked Caerphilly Castle, and for the next two months there was conflict and devastation throughout the Glamorgan region.

=== Modern history ===
By the 20th century all evidence of the village had vanished and local residents had no idea of its previous existence. When the Snocem Concrete works and the Cosmeston limestone quarry closed in 1970, the land was developed under Countryside Commission funding as a country park. During the landscaping of the new country park the first evidence of the medieval village was unearthed and an archeological exploration was undertaken.

In addition to being open to the general public, the village accepts school tours and archeological groups, together with staging of special events and re-enactments throughout the year.

=== The present ===
Cosmeston has been used as a film location for many productions, including a 2014 episode of the hit BBC TV drama series Doctor Who, Merlin and Galavant.
