= Staple =

Staple may refer to:

- Staple food, a foodstuff that forms the basic constituent of a diet
- Staple (fastener), a small formed metal fastener
  - Surgical staple

== Arts, entertainment, and media ==
- Staple (band), a Christian post-hardcore band
  - Staple (2002 album), an album by Staple
  - Staple (2004 album), an album by Staple
  - Staple (EP), a 2003 EP by Staple
- STAPLE!, a convention for creators of comics and other independent media

== Fibers ==
- Staple (textiles), the raw material of fiber from which textiles are made
- Staple (wool), wool fibers that naturally form themselves into locks

== Places ==
- Staple, Kent, a village in Kent, England near Sandwich
  - Staple railway station, serving the village of Staple
- Staple, Nord, a commune in the Nord department in northern France
- Staple Island, a small rocky island in the Farne Islands in Northumberland, England

== Other uses ==
- Staple Design, a visual communications agency
- Staple financing, a form of financing package offered to potential bidders during an acquisition
- Staple Inn, in London, England, the last surviving Inn of Chancery
- The Staple, in English historiography, the entire medieval system of trade and its taxation
- Staple (trade), a system of government control of exports particularly common in the Middle Ages

== See also ==
- Staple Hill (disambiguation)
- Stapleford (disambiguation), a number of places in the United Kingdom
- Staples (disambiguation)
