= James Staples =

James Staples may refer to:

- Jim Staples (born 1965), English rugby union footballer
- James Frederick Staples (1929–2016), Australian judicial officer
- Jaime Staples (born 1991), Canadian poker player born James Staples
- James T. Staples, a 1908 Tombigbee River sternwheel paddle steamer
