= Stableford (disambiguation) =

Stableford is a scoring system used in the sport of golf.

Stableford may also refer to:

- Brian Stableford (born 1948), British science fiction writer
- Howard Stableford (born 1959), British television and radio presenter

== See also ==
- Competition Stableford Adjustment, a mechanism used by handicap systems in golf
- Stapleford (disambiguation)
- Stableford, a Staffordshire village in Chapel and Hill Chorlton civil parish
