= Staples (surname) =

Staples is a surname of English origin. People with the surname include:

- The Staples Baronets, a family based at Lissan House, County Tyrone
  - Sir Robert Staples, 12th Baronet (1853-1943), Northern Irish artist
- Abram Penn Staples (1885–1951), American lawyer, legislator, Associate Justice of the Virginia Supreme Court and Attorney General of Virginia
- Aliesha Staples, digital technology entrepreneur from New Zealand
- Chris Staples, American singer-songwriter
- Curtis Staples (born 1976), American former basketball player
- Cyril Staples (1876–1936), Australian-born English cricketer
- Emily Anne Staples (1929-2018), American politician
- Gary Staples (1940-2021), American politician
- Greg Staples (born 1970), English comic book artist
- Isaac Staples (1816–1898), American businessman
- James Frederick "Jim" Staples (1929–2016), Australian judicial officer
- Jeff Staples (born 1975), Canadian ice hockey player
- Jim Staples (born 1965), English former rugby union footballer
- Justin Staples (born 1989), American football player
- King G. Staples (1851-1910), American politician
- Mavis Staples (born 1939), American singer and activist
- Peter Staples (born 1947), Australian politician
- Pops Staples (1914–2000), American musician
- Sam Staples (1892–1950), English cricketer
- Samuel Sandford Staples, Canadian politician
- Todd Staples (born 1963), American politician
- Vince Staples (born 1993), American rapper
- Waller Redd Staples (1826–1897), American lawyer, slave owner, politician and Associate Justice of the Virginia Supreme Court
- Wellesley Wilson Staples, Canadian politician from Ontario
- William R. Staples, Chief Justice (1854–1856) and Associate Justice of the Rhode Island Supreme Court

== See also ==
- Justice Staples (disambiguation)
