= Staples =

Staples commonly refers to:

- Staple (fastener), a small strip of folded metal used to fasten sheets of paper together
- Staples Inc., an office supply chain store with headquarters in North America
- Staple food, a food that is eaten routinely and considered a dominant portion of a standard diet

Staples may also refer to:

== Places ==
- Staples Corner, United Kingdom
- Staples, Minnesota, United States
  - Staples station
- Staples, Texas, United States
- Staples Pond, in Temple, Maine, United States

== Other uses ==
- Staples (surname), including a list of people with the name
  - Staples baronets, a former title in the Baronetage of Ireland
- Staples Canada, a Canadian retail sales company
- Staples High School, Westport, Connecticut, United States
- Staples Subdivision, a railway in Minnesota, United States
- The Staple Singers, or The Staples, an American singing group
- "Staples", a song by Relient K from the 2000 album Relient K

== See also ==
- Staple (disambiguation)
- Staples thesis, a theory of Canadian economic development
- Crypto.com Arena, earlier Staples Center, in Los Angeles, California, United States
