= Justice Staples =

Justice Staples may refer to:

- Abram Penn Staples (1885–1951), American lawyer, legislator, associate justice of the Virginia Supreme Court and Attorney General of Virginia
- James Frederick Staples (1929–2016), Australian judicial officer, Deputy President (1975–1989) of the Australian Conciliation and Arbitration Commission
- Waller Redd Staples (1826–1897), American lawyer, slave owner, politician and associate justice of the Virginia Supreme Court
- William R. Staples (1798–1868), Chief Justice (1854–1856) and associate justice of the Rhode Island Supreme Court
