= Exc =

Exc or EXC may refer to:

- EXC code, a condensed matter physics software package
- Excalibur Airways, a defunct English airline
- Exelon, an American energy company
- Exeter Central railway station, in England
- Exhibition Centre station (MTR), in Hong Kong

== See also ==
- Esc (disambiguation)
