= Temple, Maine =

Town in Maine, United States

- Town
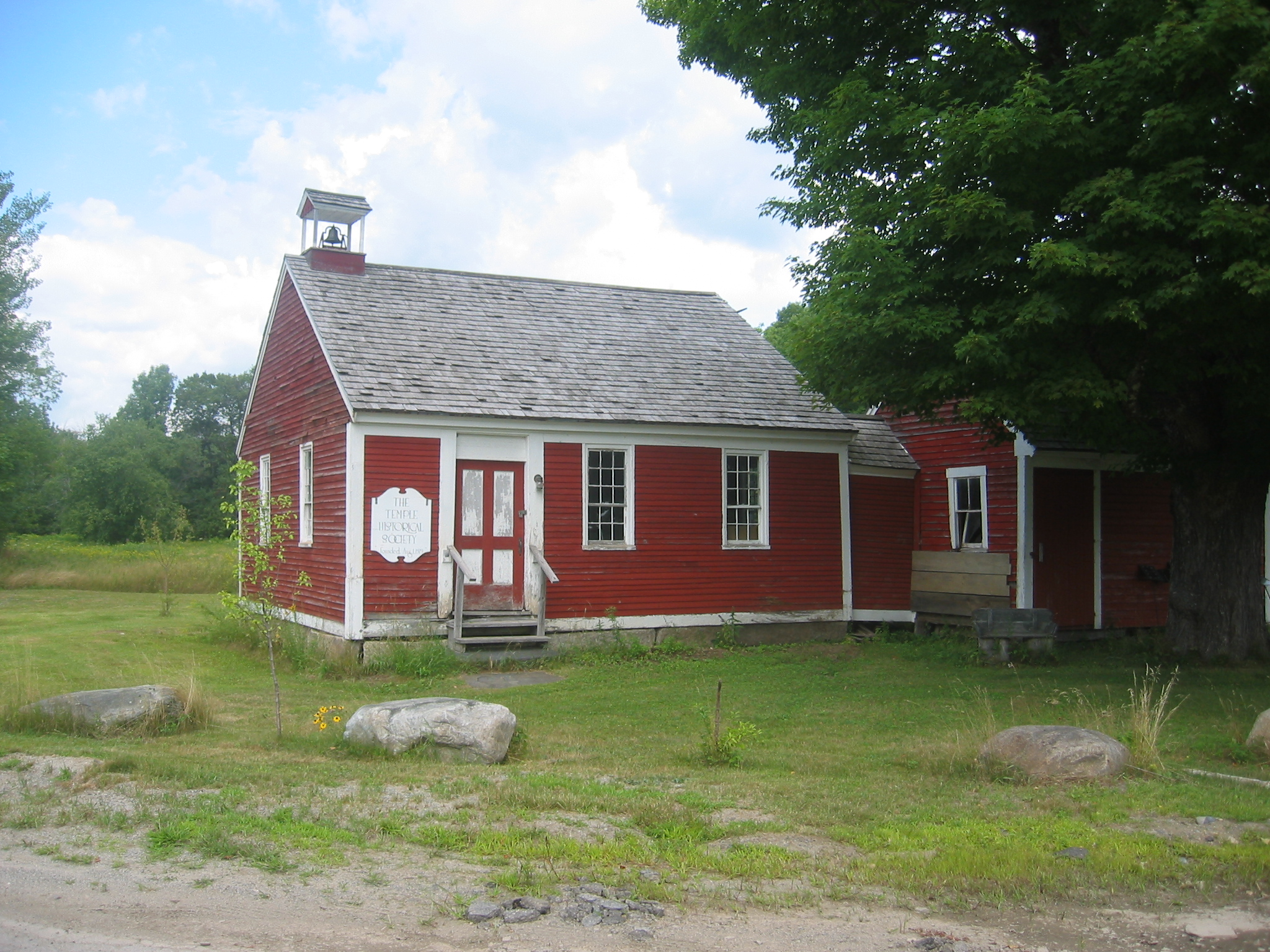
- Temple Historical Society, formerly the historic No. 5 Schoolhouse

- Location within Maine Location within the United States
- Coordinates: 44°43′25″N 70°15′32″W
- Country: United States
- State: Maine
- County: Franklin
- Villages: Temple; Temple Intervale

Area
  - Total: 35.76 sq mi (92.62 km^{2})
  - Land: 35.53 sq mi (92.02 km^{2})
  - Water: 0.23 sq mi (0.60 km^{2})
- Elevation: 1,263 ft (385 m)

Population (2020)
  - Total: 527
  - Density: 15/sq mi (5.7/km^{2})
- Time zone: UTC-5 (Eastern (EST))
  - Summer (DST): UTC-4 (EDT)
- ZIP code: 04984
- Area code: 207
- FIPS code: 23-75980
- GNIS feature ID: 582761
- Website: townoftemple.org

Temple is a town in Franklin County, Maine, United States. The town was named after Temple, New Hampshire. It is located at the end of Maine State Route 43 (Temple Road), and is said to be one of only two towns in Maine to be situated at the end of a public highway. The population was 527 at the 2020 census.

== History ==
Hill-farmers from Temple, New Hampshire, Old North Yarmouth, Maine, and nearby Farmington settled the town beginning in 1796. It was incorporated in 1803. Commercial sawmills operated on Temple Stream in the village for many years in the 1800s and 1900s, providing the town a robust local economy. Logging is still vibrant in Temple, but its timber is now trucked to mills in nearby towns. The town contains a town hall (formerly an elementary school), a post office in the former general store (no longer has a post office), a theater (formerly the Congregational Church. The bell tower now sits in a semi-restored state at the town hall), a fire station, and a youth baseball field, established in 1957, commemorating the life of Larry Boyce, the former Temple Townies player and manager for whom the field is named.

What is now Maple Street was once called Cowturd Lane, due to "the smell of manure, fresh from cows walking in the road on their way to (pasture) and back, hanging in the air like swamp gas."

Temple is a sanctuary for writers, poets, artists, and crafters, and the setting for several novels, biographies, and memoirs: Shawno (George Dennison), Temple (Dennison), Temple Stream: A Rural Odyssey (Bill Roorbach), Upcountry: Reflections from a Rural Life (Robert Kimber), A Soldier's Son: An American Boyhood During World War II (John E. Hodgkins), and The Town that Ends the Road (Theodore Enslin).

Besides the above, a number of well-known writers either lived or summered in Temple, including Denise Levertov, Mitchell Goodman, and C. J. Stevens.

== Geography ==
According to the United States Census Bureau, the town has a total area of 35.76 square miles (92.62 km^{2}), of which 35.53 square miles (92.02 km^{2}) is land and 0.23 square miles (0.60 km^{2}) is water.

== Demographics ==
Historical population
Census	Pop.	Note	%±
1810	482		—
1820	615		27.6%
1830	795		29.3%
1840	955		20.1%
1850	785		−17.8%
1860	726		−7.5%
1870	640		−11.8%
1880	580		−9.4%
1890	470		−19.0%
1900	394		−16.2%
1910	403		2.3%
1920	425		5.5%
1930	315		−25.9%
1940	252		−20.0%
1950	284		12.7%
1960	314		10.6%
1970	367		16.9%
1980	518		41.1%
1990	560		8.1%
2000	572		2.1%
2010	528		−7.7%
2020	527		−0.2%
U.S. Decennial Census

=== 2010 census ===
As of the census of 2010, there were 528 people, 226 households, and 141 families residing in the town. The population density was 14.9 inhabitants per square mile (5.8/km^{2}). There were 327 housing units at an average density of 9.2 per square mile (3.6/km^{2}). The racial makeup of the town was 97.7% White, 1.1% Native American, 0.6% Asian, 0.2% from other races, and 0.4% from two or more races. Hispanic or Latino of any race were 0.8% of the population.

There were 226 households, of which 24.8% had children under the age of 18 living with them, 53.5% were married couples living together, 6.6% had a female householder with no husband present, 2.2% had a male householder with no wife present, and 37.6% were non-families. 30.5% of all households were made up of individuals, and 8.8% had someone living alone who was 65 years of age or older. The average household size was 2.34 and the average family size was 2.94.

The median age in the town was 45.6 years. 20.6% of residents were under the age of 18; 6.4% were between the ages of 18 and 24; 22.2% were from 25 to 44; 36% were from 45 to 64; and 15% were 65 years of age or older. The gender makeup of the town was 51.3% male and 48.7% female.

=== 2000 census ===
As of the census of 2000, there were 572 people, 228 households, and 165 families residing in the town. The population density was 16.1 people per square mile (6.2/km^{2}). There were 316 housing units at an average density of 8.9 per square mile (3.4/km^{2}). The racial makeup of the town was 98.60% White, 0.17% Native American, 0.52% Asian, and 0.70% from two or more races. Hispanic or Latino of any race were 0.52% of the population.

There were 228 households, out of which 35.1% had children under the age of 18 living with them, 57.5% were married couples living together, 7.9% had a female householder with no husband present, and 27.6% were non-families. 22.4% of all households were made up of individuals, and 7.0% had someone living alone who was 65 years of age or older. The average household size was 2.48 and the average family size was 2.79.

In the town, the population was spread out, with 25.7% under the age of 18, 4.9% from 18 to 24, 29.4% from 25 to 44, 27.1% from 45 to 64, and 12.9% who were 65 years of age or older. The median age was 40 years. For every 100 females, there were 107.2 males. For every 100 females age 18 and over, there were 105.3 males.

The median income for a household in the town was $33,750, and the median income for a family was $34,931. Males had a median income of $29,844 versus $24,688 for females. The per capita income for the town was $16,905. About 7.6% of families and 10.1% of the population were below the poverty line, including 10.1% of those under age 18 and 22.8% of those age 65 or over.

== Notable people ==
- John Fairfield Dryden, founder Prudential Life Insurance Company and senator
- Helen Jewett, also known as Dorcas Doyen, noted New York City murder victim
- Harvey Parker, Boston hotelier and originator of Parker House rolls

== Gallery ==
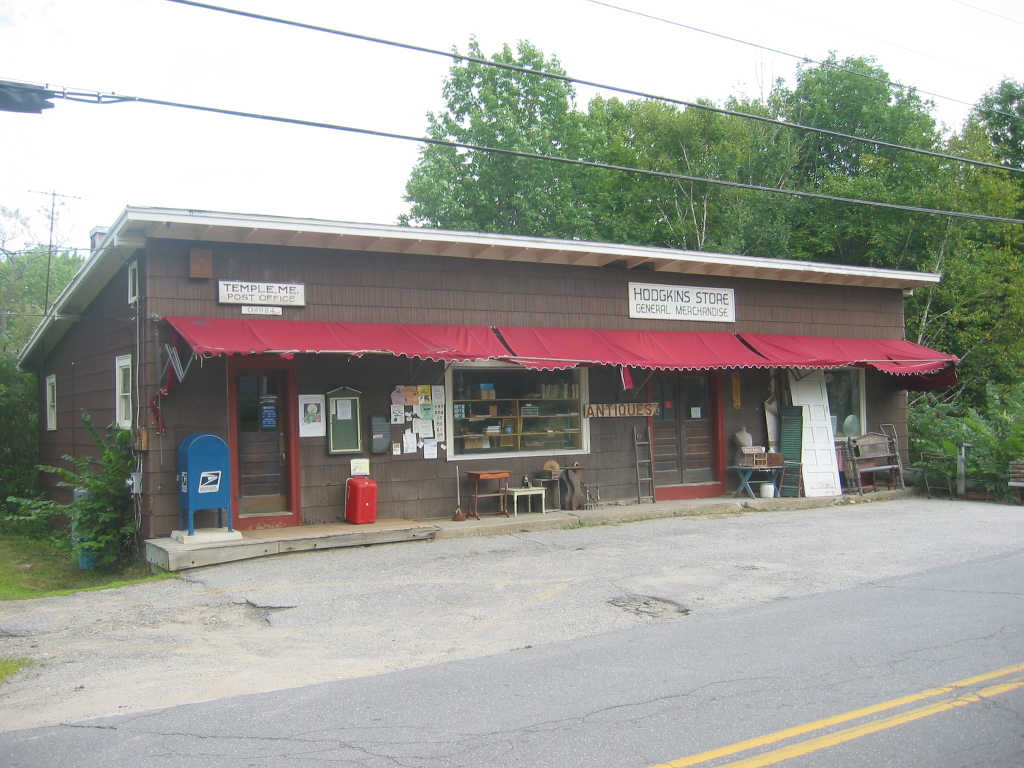
U.S. Post Office and former Hodgkins General Store, on Temple Road

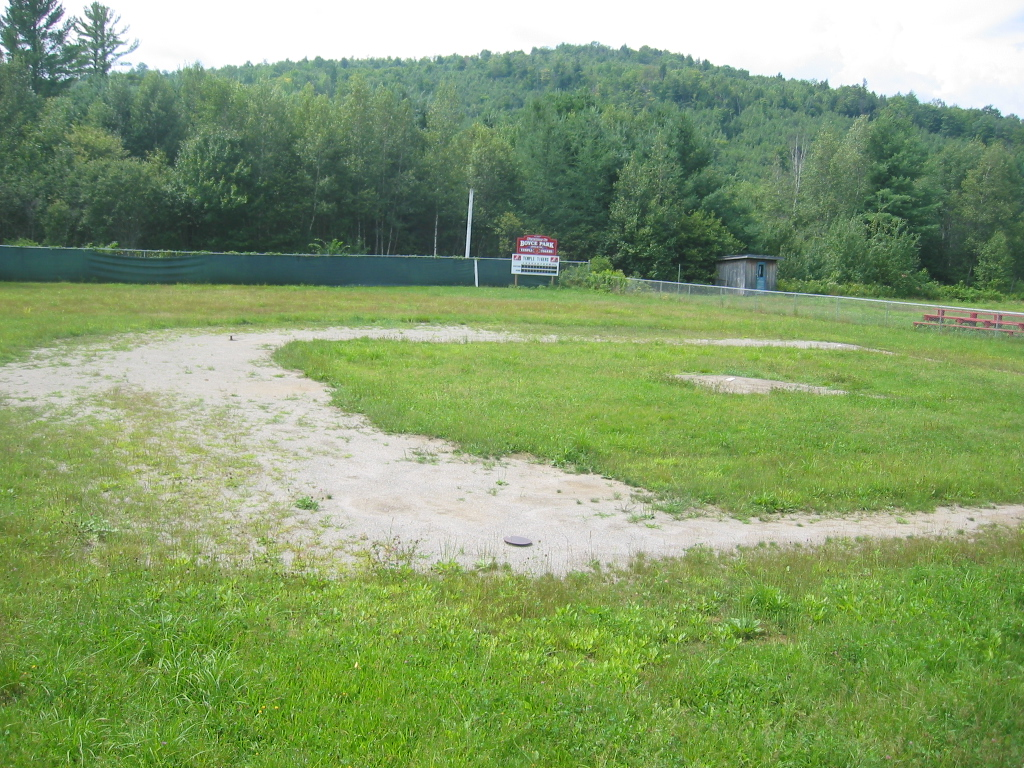
Boyce Park, home of the Temple Tigers youth baseball team

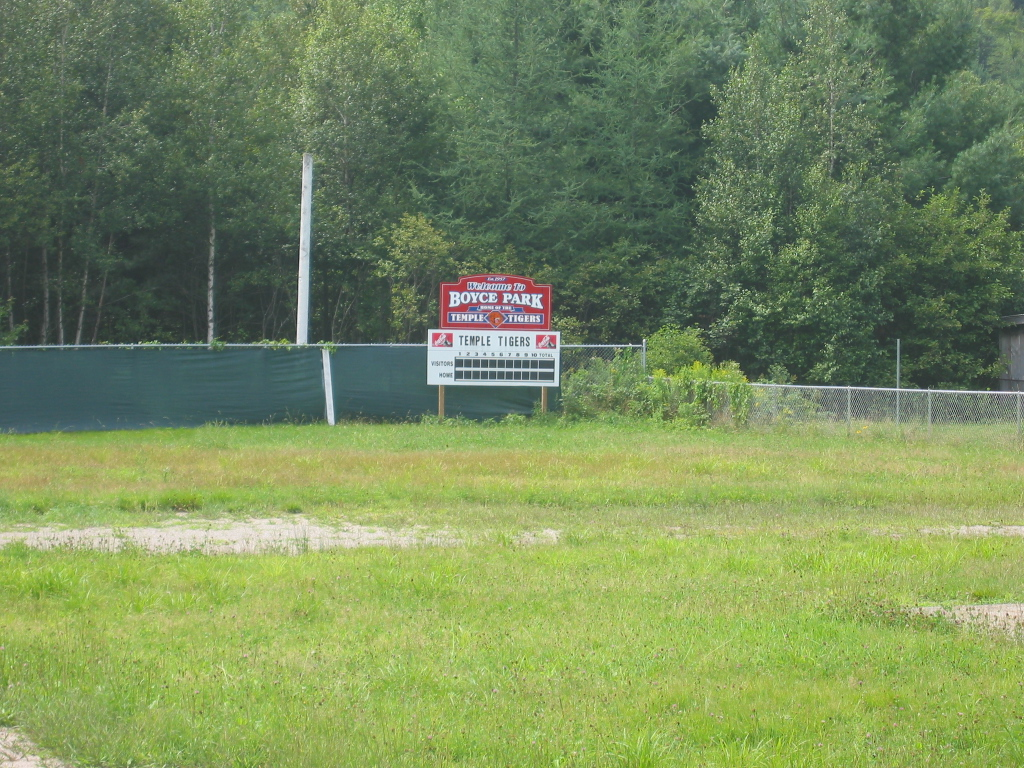
Boyce Park's scoreboard

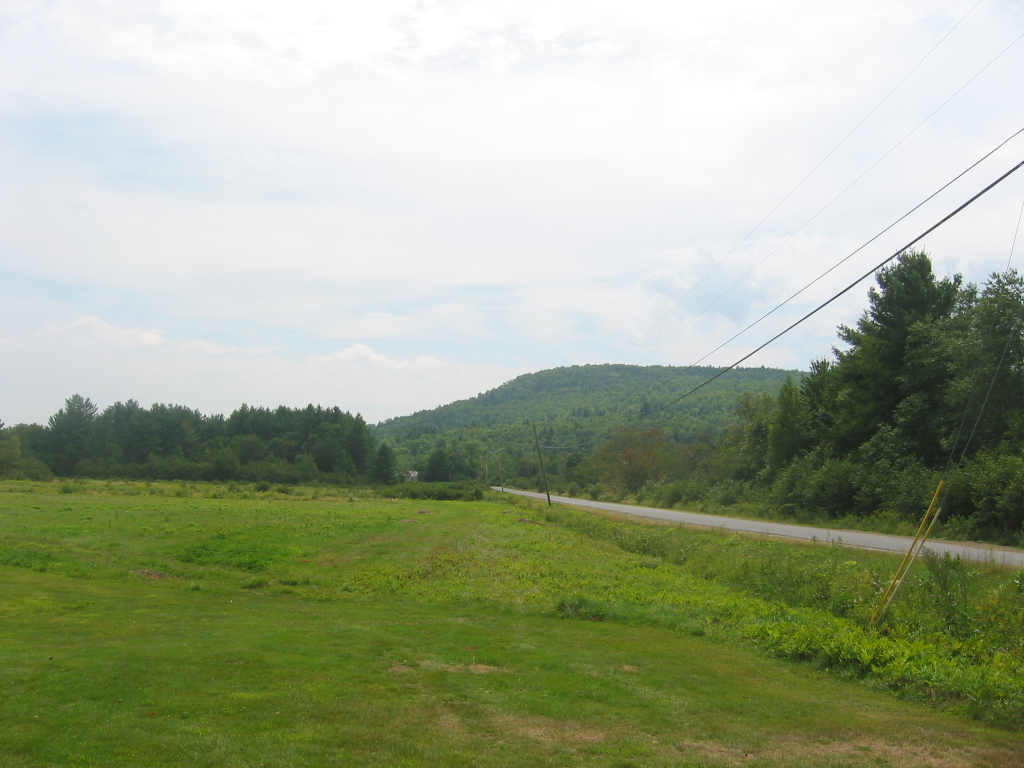
Looking south along Intervale Road from its intersection with Day Mountain Road

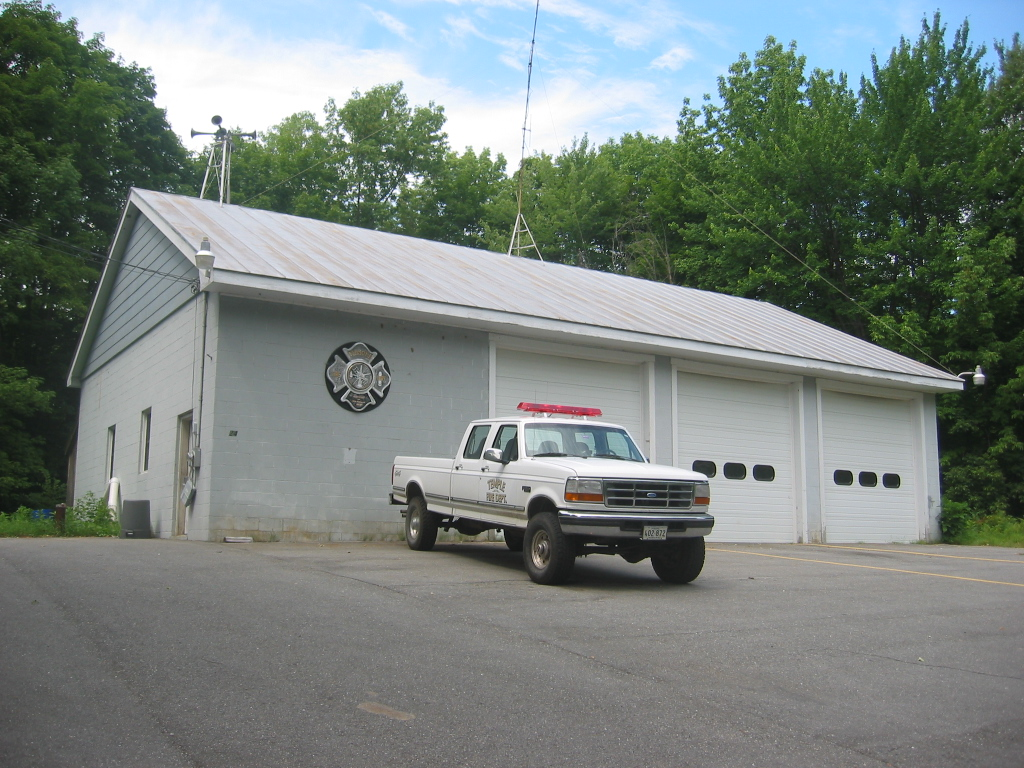
Temple Fire Station

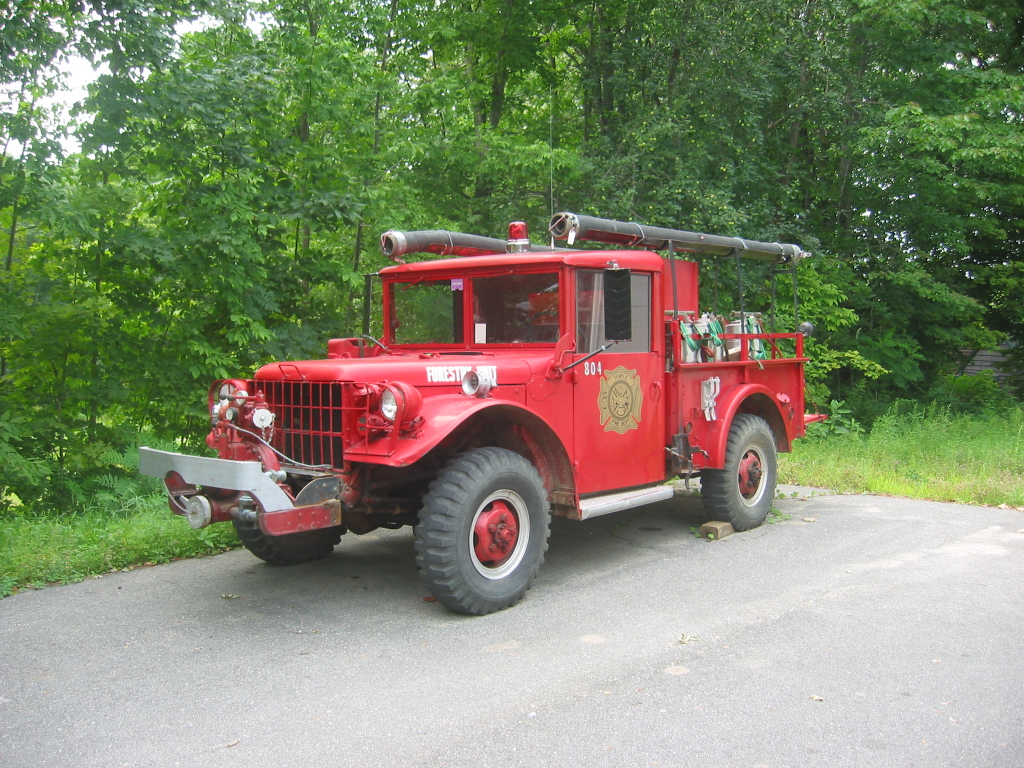
An early Temple fire truck

== See also ==
- Staples Pond
