= Temple Stream =

Location
- Country: United States
- County: Franklin County

Physical characteristics
- Source: Jessie Pond
  - location: Temple, Maine
  - coordinates: 44.748°N 70.250°W
- Mouth: Sandy River
  - location: West Farmington, Maine
  - coordinates: 44.656°N 70.147°W

Temple Stream is a small river in Franklin County, Maine, United States. It is located in the Kennebec River watershed.

It is named for the town of Temple, Maine. Temple's Intervale Road runs along the stream's southern banks, while Cummings Hill Road crosses it, near it its intersection with Maple Street.

The stream is sourced from Jessie Pond, around 4.5 miles (7.2 km) north of Temple, and flows into Sandy River, just to the east of West Farmington.

In 2022, the Walton's Mill Dam in Farmington was demolished, allowing Temple Stream to flow freely through Walton's Mill for the first time in 240 years. The change was made to allow fish passage, in turn protecting the endangered Atlantic salmon, which have been spawning at the site.

In 2005, Bill Roorbach published Temple Stream: A Rural Odyssey. It is also frequently mentioned in A Soldier's Son: An American Boyhood During World War II (2006) by John E. Hodgkins.

== See also ==
- List of rivers in Maine
