= Temple Intervale School =

Historic one-room schoolhouse in Maine, US

- U.S. National Register of Historic Places
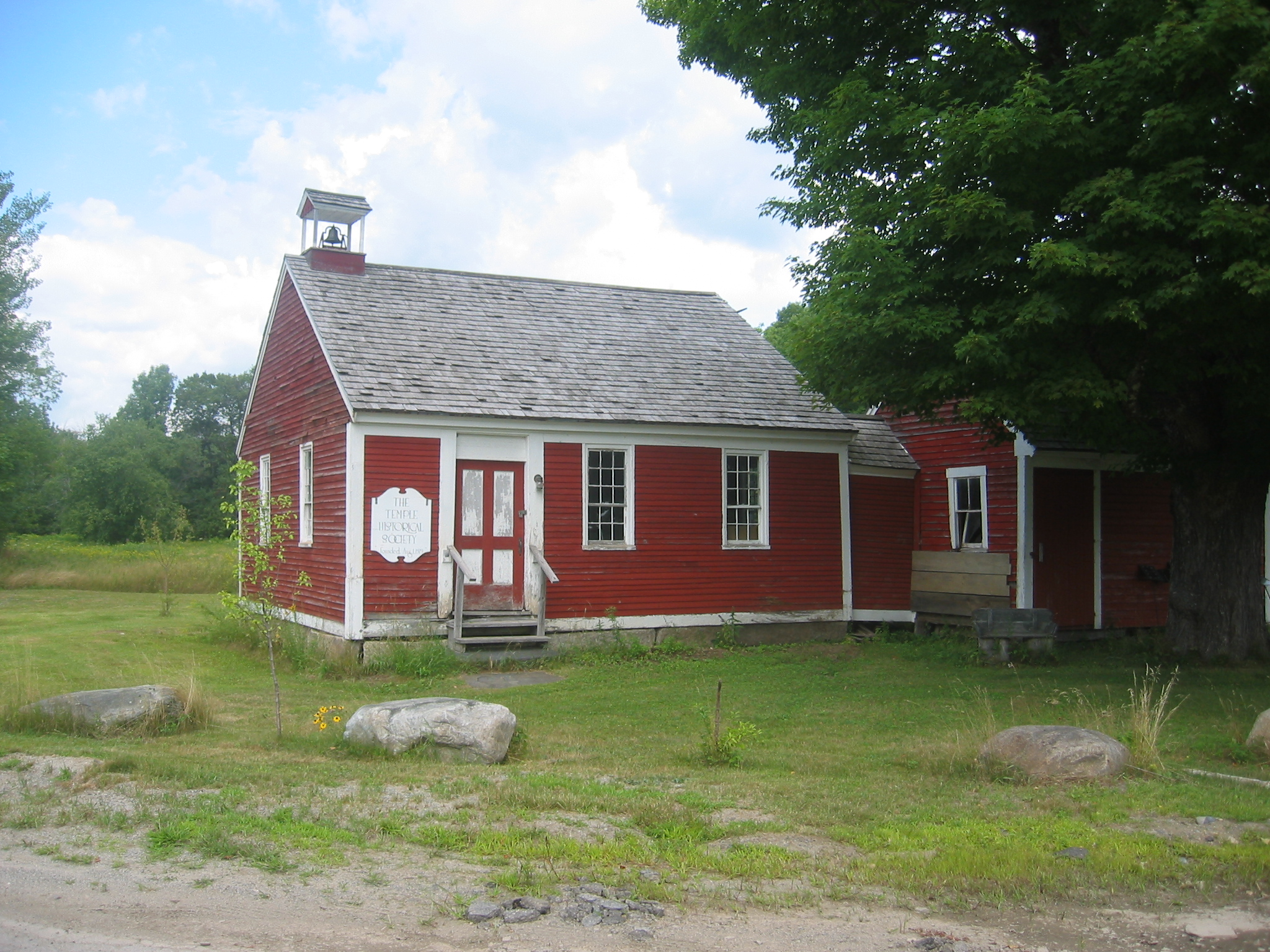

- Location within Maine Location within the United States
- Location: Intervale and Day Mountain Roads, Temple, Maine
- Coordinates: 44°41′54″N 70°14′45″W
- Area: 0.3 acres (0.12 ha)
- Built: 1810
- NRHP reference No.: 85000240
- Added to NRHP: February 8, 1985

The Temple Intervale School, also known as the District No. 5 Schoolhouse, is a historic one-room district schoolhouse at Intervale and Day Mountain Roads in Temple, Maine. Built in 1810–11, it is one of the oldest surviving schoolhouses in western Maine, and one of its longest-used, with a recorded history of academic usage extending to 1958. The building is now maintained by the local historical society. It was listed on the National Register of Historic Places in 1985.

== Description and history ==
The small town of Temple is located at the end of Maine State Route 43, northwest of Farmington, Maine. The Intervale School is set at the northern corner of the junction of Intervale Road and Day Mountain Road, a short way north of the village center. It is a simple single-story wood frame structure, with a side-gable roof, clapboard siding, and a granite foundation. Its main facade is three bays wide, with sash windows in the two right bays, and the doorway in the left bay. To the right, is an attached passageway leading to a small shed with similar finish. The roof is topped by a small open belfry.

The town of Temple was settled in the 1790s, in part by migrants from Temple, New Hampshire. In 1810, the town meeting authorized the construction of this building, and it was here that the 1811 town meeting was held. The building was used as a school until 1958, believed to be the longest use of such a building for academic purposes in the state. The building is now maintained by the local historical society.

== See also ==
- National Register of Historic Places listings in Franklin County, Maine
