= Equitable Stroke Control =

Golf handicapping system

Equitable Stroke Control (ESC) was a component of some golf handicapping systems that were in use prior to the implementation of the World Handicap System in 2020. It was used to adjust recorded scores in order to more accurately calculate a player's handicap. Its purpose was to avoid one or more very high scores on individual holes inflating the handicap calculation.

Equitable stroke control was a sliding scale system, based on the course (or playing) handicap of the golfer.

== Equitable Stroke Control table ==
Under the USGA Handicap System, the maximum score per hole for handicapping purposes was as follows:

Course Handicap	Maximum Score per Hole
up to 9	2 over par
10 through 19	7
20 through 29	8
30 through 39	9
40 or higher	10

For example, if a golfer with a course handicap of 8, shot a score of 83, but that score includes a six on a par 3 (a triple bogey) then the posted score should be only 82. However, if a golfer with a course handicap of 11 had the same score, the proper score to post would be 83.

=== Golf Canada ===
In April 2012, Golf Canada adopted the same ESC table as the USGA. Before then, the following table was used:

Course Handicap	Maximum Score per Hole
up to 0	1 over par
1 through 18	2 over par
19 through 32	3 over par
33 or higher	4 over par

== Other methods ==
=== South Africa ===
Before October 2019, the GolfRSA Handicap System used a similar method for eliminating the impact on high hole scores on handicap calculations. Called Adjusted Gross, it used the following maximum scores per hole:

Course Handicap	Maximum Score per Hole
18 or less	2 over par
19 or higher	3 over par

In October 2019, net double bogey was adopted as the maximum score per hole.

=== Net double bogey ===
Most other handicap systems that incorporate mitigation for high hole scores, do so by means of net double bogey (two over par after any handicap strokes have been applied) as the maximum score per hole. This method is also known as Stableford Points Adjustment as it is the lowest number of strokes that would award zero points under the Stableford scoring system.
