= Joseph Kinnicutt Angell =

American legal writer (1794–1857)

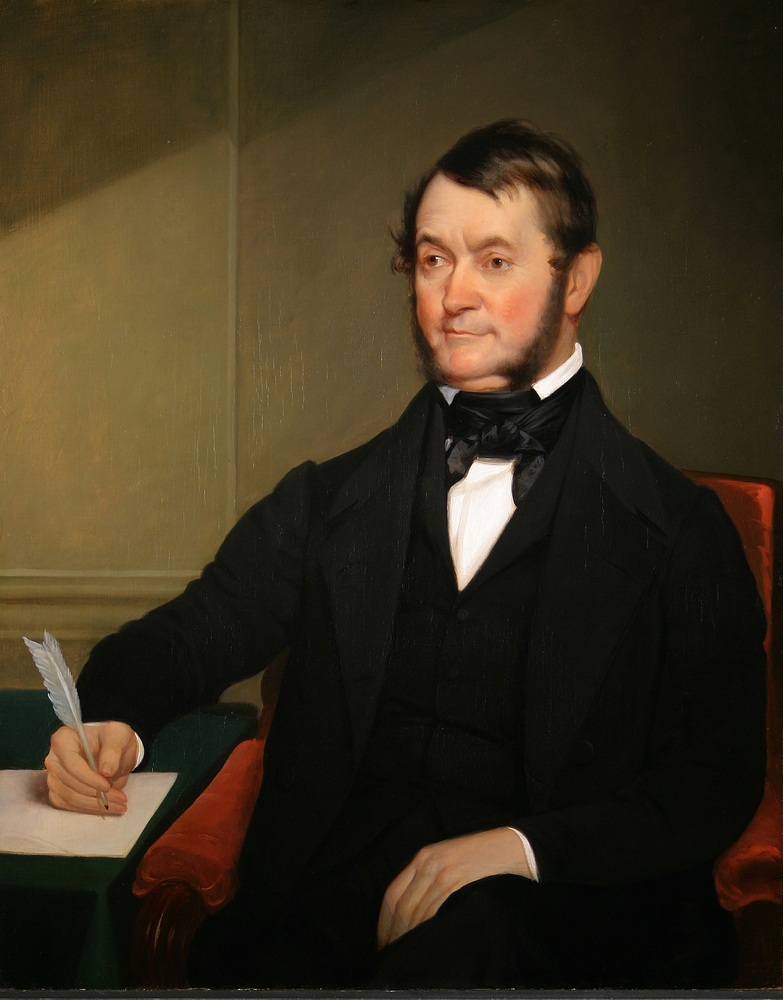
- Born: April 30, 1794; Providence, Rhode Island, United States
- Died: May 1, 1857 (aged 63); Boston, Massachusetts, United States
- Occupation: Legal writer

Joseph Kinnicutt Angell (April 30, 1794 – May 1, 1857) was an American legal writer born in Providence, Rhode Island. He graduated from Brown University with a Bachelor of Arts, and was admitted to the bar association of Rhode Island in 1816. Angell stayed in London from 1820 to 1822 to attend a case about an estate before the Court of Chancery. There, he spent most of his time at the Palace of Westminster and the Oxford University library, ultimately deciding to be a legal writer. He wrote various books and articles on topics that included property in tidewaters, incorporeal hereditaments, limitations of actions, and corporate tax. He served as the reporter of the decisions of the Supreme Court of Rhode Island from 1845 to 1849. During his term, he published two pamphlets about various cases of the supreme court. He died on May 1, 1857, in Boston, Massachusetts.

== Early life and education ==
Joseph Kinnicutt Angell was born on April 30, 1794, in Providence, Rhode Island. He was the only son of the shopkeeper Nathan Angell and his wife Amy (née Kinnicutt). Thomas Angell, one of his ancestors, was a companion of Roger Williams, the founder of the state of Rhode Island. In 1809, he entered Brown University and graduated in 1813 with a Bachelor of Arts. There, he became a member of the Society of United Brothers, an organization formed by the students who were not admitted to the Philermenian Society. Among his classmates was the future Rhode Island Chief Justice Job Durfee. In 1813, Angell joined Tapping Reeve and James Gould's Litchfield Law School in Connecticut. There, he met the future Rhode Island Governor John Brown Francis. Angell later joined the Providence office of Thomas Burgess. In 1816, he was admitted to the bar association of Rhode Island.

== Career ==
Early in his profession, Angell preferred to be a counselor than an advocate. He soon developed a reputation as a lawyer and became an advisor to the merchant community in Providence. In 1819, he received a letter from a counselor residing in London, informing him of a case before the Court of Chancery in which an estate was looking for its heir. The counselor expressed the belief that Angell was the legal heir. In February 1820, Angell left Providence to travel to London. He spent most of his time visiting the courts at the Palace of Westminster and the Oxford University library. During the hearings, according to the author Stephen Hopkins, Angell exhibited "great patience and perseverance". In 1822, the court ultimately decided against him; Angell returned to Rhode Island before the decision was rendered.

Upon returning, Angell decided to pursue the profession of a legal writer. He became a member of the newly formed Rhode Island Historical Society in 1823. In 1824, he wrote his first book, Treatise on the Common Law in Relation to Watercourses, about the law relating to watercourses and its use as a form of power in mills and manufacturing industries; over twelve thousand copies were sold. His second book, Right of Property in Tide Water and in the Soil and Shores Thereof was published in 1826 and later re-published in 1847. Writing of Angell's books, jurist, legal scholar, and former Chancellor of New York James Kent asserted that "No intelligent lawyer could well practice without them". Angell continued writing on topics like property in tidewaters, incorporeal hereditaments, limitations of actions, and corporate tax.

In 1829, Angell started the publication of the United States Law Intelligencer and Review and served as its editor. It was founded in Providence and soon was moved to Philadelphia. During this time, he published A Treatise on the Limitations of Actions at Law and Suits in Equity. Examining the legal consequences of "the infinite number of corporations" in the United States, he wrote Treatise on the Law of Private Corporations Aggregate (1832) and Essay on the Right of a State to Tax a Body Corporate (1837) with Samuel Ames. In 1842, Angell signed the article titled "The Right of the People to Form a Constitution" (also known as "Nine Lawyers' Opinion") which asserted that "the legislature was the creature of the people, and was not superior to its creator". After the adoption of the Constitution of Rhode Island in 1842, the position of reporter of the decisions of the Supreme Court of Rhode Island was created. Subsequent amendments directed the supreme court to appoint a reporter following the March 1845 elections. Angell was appointed as the reporter. He prepared two pamphlets about various cases of the supreme court before resigning in September 1849.

== Later life and death ==
After resigning, Angell wrote Law of Carriers of Goods and Passengers by Land and Water (1849) and Treatise on the Law of Highways (1857) on laws about transportation companies, and Treatise on the Law of Fire and Life Insurance (1854) about insurance companies in the United States. He died on May 1, 1857, in Boston, Massachusetts. In 1999, the author Mark Warren Bailey wrote that Angell's writing met the "perceived need of a growing nation for a clear summary of current law as well as the necessity of selecting and featuring the most important cases from the rapidly growing number of adjudged cases and state reports." His success is often attributed to his simple and direct writing style.

== Works cited ==
- Arnold, James N., ed. (1883). The Narragansett Historical Register. Narragansett Historical Publishing Company – via Internet Archive.
- Austin, John Osborne, ed. (1891). The Ancestral Dictionary. E. L. Freeman & Sons – via Internet Archive.
- Bailey, Mark Warren (2000) [1999]. "Angell, Joseph Kinnicutt". American National Biography. Oxford University Press. doi:10.1093/anb/9780198606697.article.1100017. ISBN 978-0-19-860669-7.
- Triennial Catalogue of the United Brothers' Society of Brown University. Brown University. 1848 – via Google Books.
- Carroll, Charles (1932). Rhode Island: Three Centuries of Democracy. Vol. 2. Lewis Historical Publishing Company – via Internet Archive.
- Dorn, Nathan (September 24, 2021). "Collection Highlights: Chancellor James Kent". Library of Congress.
- Hopkins, Stephen (1880). Rhode Island Historical Tracts No. 11. S. S. Rider – via Google Books.
- Mitchell, Martha (1993). "United Brothers". Encyclopedia Brunoniana – via Brown University.
- Mott, Frank Luther (1957). A History of American Magazines: 1741–1850. Harvard University Press.
- Proceedings of the Rhode Island Historical Society. Rhode Island Historical Society. 1872 – via Internet Archive.
