= Glamorganshire Golf Club =

Golf club in the Lower Penarth, Wales

Coordinates: 51°25′16.95″N 03°11′00.78″W

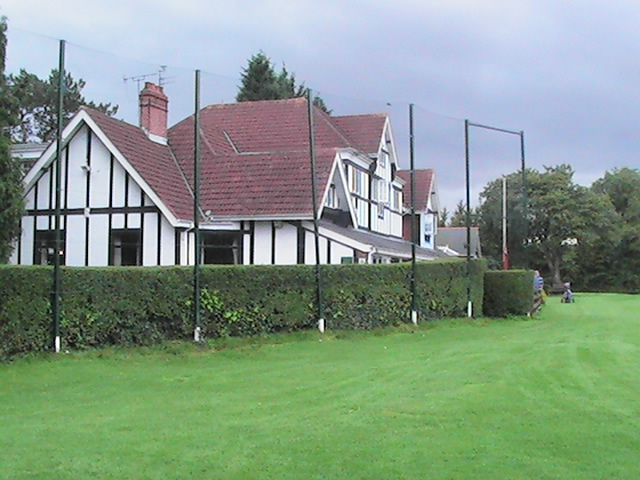
The Clubhouse from the 18th fairway

Glamorganshire Golf Club is located in Lower Penarth in the Vale of Glamorgan, Wales, 7.3 miles (11.7 kilometres) south west from the capital city of Cardiff and is one of the oldest golf clubs in Wales. The club was founded by the Earl of Plymouth.

The club played a leading role in the founding of the Welsh Golf Union, and it twice hosted the Welsh Amateur Championship as well as the Welsh Ladies inaugural Championships in it early years.

In 1898 the club was the testing ground of Dr Frank Stableford's new Stableford revolutionary golf scoring system still used today.

Although near the sea, the Glamorganshire course is not a links, but an 18-hole parkland course on gently undulating ground at the eastern edge of what is now Cosmeston Lakes Country Park.

== Foundation ==
In 1890 the Earl of Plymouth gifted an extensive plot of land in Lower Penarth and the club was founded initially as a nine-hole course. The club undertook an expansion programme to the full eighteen-hole course during 1896 and the following year enabling the 1897 Welsh Amateur Championship to take place in Penarth for the first time.

== The Stableford scoring system ==
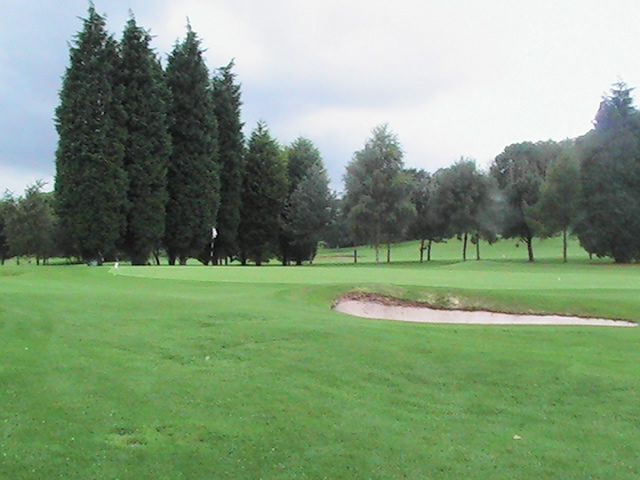
A view of the course from the clubhouse area

The Stableford method of golf scoring, a system now utilised and revered, particularly by amateur golfers, the world over, was first devised by a Glamorganshire club member, Dr. Frank Barney Gordon Stableford. He first tried it out on fellow members of the club on 30 September 1898.

Prior to this revolutionary experiment here was no stroke indexing system available to golfers. Essentially all holes were played to par and the ‘Stableford’ points applied. At the end of the game one third of the players handicap was added to the overall ‘Stableford’ adjusted score. The maximum handicap for the event was fifteen. The new system obviously favoured the better golfer at the time which is hardly surprising as the good doctor was a single figure handicapper.

Stableford himself did not actually participate in his initial experiment though he donated a special prize to the winner, Mr W Hastings Watson, who scored a remarkable forty two points. There is no indication of what the members thought about the alternative of scoring by points or, indeed, whether they tried it out on any other occasions.

Dr Stableford, who was a resident of Whitchurch, Cardiff at the time, left the Glamorganshire Golf Club when he set off to serve as an Army Surgeon in the Boer War. On his return to Wales he joined the Royal Porthcawl Golf Club where he won the Royal Porthcawl Championship in 1907 and in the same year reached the semi -final of the Welsh Amateur Championship.

== The Barbarians rugby football club ==
It is probable that no other golf club in the world can lay claim to have hosted so many great rugby players from all over the world, because the famous Barbarians visited the Glamorganshire club every Easter Sunday between 1901 and 1996 as part of their traditional Easter weekend touring fixtures against famous Welsh clubs.

Their Sunday 'official golf frolic' is regarded a major part of the Barbarians legend and, in the eyes of most of their players, was almost of equal importance to the weekend's rugby. The competitive sporting drive of the rugby stars was as evident on the golf course as it was on any rugby field.

In 1924–25 in recognition of the generosity of the golf club, ninety five Barbarian members subscribed a total of £52.17s.0d for a 95-ounce perpetual silver cup called the Barbarians Challenge Cup, to be completed for annually by club members on Easter Monday to commemorate the eagerly anticipated Easter visits by the Barbarians.

The mounted head of a Springbok, presented to the Barbarians team after they defeated the South African national team in 1961, remains on display in the golf club's bar to this day.

== Military ==
During World War II Glamorganshire Golf Course was the location of an experimental rocket battery as part of the town's air defences. The battery was manned by 50 soldiers from the Royal Artillery who were billeted in a small 'village' of Nissen huts built in the club's grounds. Unannounced practice firings of the rocket battery frequently caused concern and alarm amongst local residents. Several public air raid shelters, for Lower Penarth residents and workers at the Cement Factory, were constructed in the club grounds and on the land that now forms part of Cosmeston Country Park.

== Guy Gibson VC ==
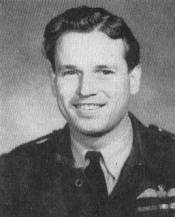
Wing Commander Guy Penrose Gibson VC

Guy Gibson the leader of the legendary Dam Busters raid over Germany in World War II, was not only an honorary member of Glamorganshire Golf Club but when the news came that he had been awarded the Victoria Cross he celebrated that night in the clubhouse.

Wing Commander Gibson's association with Glamorganshire began when the air ace met a young Penarthian, Eve Moore, at a party in Coventry during early December 1939 while he was on three days rest leave at his brother's house.

The following year Gibson and Eve were married at All Saints Church in Penarth. Guy Gibson flew his Blenheim bomber from his airbase in Lincolnshire to RAF Pengam Moors for the wedding.

Eve's parents, Mr and Mrs Ernest Moore, lived in Archer Road, Penarth, and the couple moved in with them while they considered buying a home of their own. Ernest Moore was a keen golfer and invited his new son-in-law to join the Glamorganshire club as an honorary member.

After the Dambusters raid took place in May 1943, widely hailed as a turning point of the War, Gibson spent his two-week post-raid leave in Penarth, playing golf on most days. While he was on that leave he had a call from the Air Ministry telling him that he had been awarded the VC. Ernest Moore immediately telephoned the steward at Glamorganshire and asked to lay on as many drinks as he could find and the whole family went down to celebrate in style at the clubhouse.

Gibson was an enthusiastic golfer and often returned to his favourite course at the Glamorganshire club while on leave until his death.
