= Samuel Ames (jurist) =

American judge

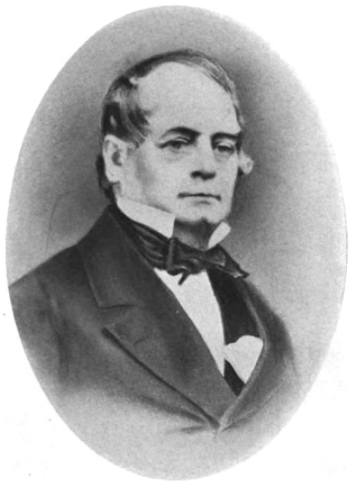

Chief Justice of the Rhode Island Supreme Court
- In office June 26, 1856 – November 15, 1865
- Preceded by: William R. Staples
- Succeeded by: Charles S. Bradley

Speaker of the Rhode Island House of Representatives
- In office May 1844 – May 1845
- Preceded by: Alfred Bosworth
- Succeeded by: George Gordon King

Member of the Rhode Island House of Representatives
- In office 1841–1851

Personal details
- Born: September 6, 1806 Providence, Rhode Island
- Died: December 20, 1865 (aged 59) Providence, Rhode Island
- Party: Whig, Law-and-Order
- Spouse: Mary Throop Dorr (m. 1838)
- Children: Mary, Sullivan, William, Edward, and Samuel
- Education: Philips Academy; Brown University; Litchfield Law School

Samuel Ames (September 6, 1806 – December 20, 1865) was an American lawyer, jurist, and politician who served as the chief justice of the Rhode Island Supreme Court from 1856 to 1865. Despite his relatively short tenure, he is considered to have been Rhode Island's greatest chief justice. He is most remembered for his opinion in Taylor v. Place, which enshrined Rhode Island's judiciary as a coequal branch of government.

== Early life ==
Ames was born in Providence, Rhode Island, to Samuel Ames, a wealthy merchant, and his wife, Anne Becker Checkley. After an education at Philips Academy Andover, he matriculated at Brown University when he was thirteen, graduating in 1823. He briefly studied at Litchfield Law School before reading law under former Attorney General Samuel Bridgham.

== Legal career ==
Ames was admitted to the Rhode Island Bar in 1826 and soon established a preeminent commercial litigation practice, arguing frequently before the United States Supreme Court. In 1826, he partnered with Joseph Angell to write the Treatise on the Law of Private Corporations Aggregate, a leading authority on the subject that went through ten editions.

== Political career ==
Ames was a prominent figure among Rhode Island's Whigs. He served on the Providence City Council before serving in the Rhode Island House from 1841 to 1851, presiding as speaker in the 1844–45 term. He served on a number of commissions, including the 1853 commission that adjusted Rhode Island's border with Massachusetts and the Peace Conference of 1861.

=== Dorr Rebellion ===
Despite having attended Andover with Thomas Wilson Dorr and married his sister, Ames, a leading Law-and-Order voice, was a vociferous opponent of Dorr's reforms. As a doctrinaire Whig, he was skeptical of populism, fearing that it would lead to both mob rule and a tyrannical executive. Under the pseudonym Town Borne, he wrote numerous attacks on the expansion of suffrage, though he later supported the expansion of the franchise. During the Dorr Rebellion, he served as quartermaster general of the state troops and commanded the state arsenal during Dorr's unsuccessful attack. Once Dorr's Rebellion had made the need for constitutional change clear, Ames was a vocal advocate of the Law-and-Order Convention, which revised Dorr's People's Constitution to retain legislative superiority.

== Judicial service ==
Ames was appointed by the General Assembly to succeed William R. Staples as chief justice of the Rhode Island Supreme Court on June 26, 1856. To compensate for the loss of his remunerative corporate practice, he was appointed Reporter as well. He resigned from the bench in 1865 due to poor health, dying suddenly weeks later.

=== Modernizations ===
During his time on the Court, he was a vocal advocate for the jurisprudential benefits of judicial opinions. He required the Court to publish an opinion explaining the facts and its reasoning in all cases; previously, the judges had delivered oral statements or cursory written opinions. He also modernized the Court's rules of procedure and professionalized the Court's reporting. These quality improvements resulted in a significant increase in Rhode Island's judicial caseload; previously, litigants had filed equitable suits in federal court if at all possible, owing in part to equity scholar Justice Joseph Story's long tenure riding circuit.

=== Taylor v. Place ===
In his first term on the Court, Ames decided Taylor v. Place, which abrogated legislative supremacy over the judiciary. Analyzing the nature of the judicial power, Ames ruled that, under the 1843 Constitution, the General Assembly could no longer pass legislation overruling judgements. Considered the most important opinion in Rhode Island's history, Taylor drew comparisons to Chief Justice Marshall's opinion in Marbury v. Madison and served as an early antecedent to U.S. v. Klein.

=== Ames v. Hazard ===
Shortly before joining the bench, Ames represented Ives, the successful plaintiff in Ives v. Hazard. As Reporter, he prepared the report of the case, leading Hazard to accuse him of libeling him. This led Ames to sue Hazard for libelously accusing him of libel, a dispute that was heard by the Rhode Island Supreme Court in Ames v. Hazard.

== Personal life ==
In 1838, Ames married Mary Throop Dorr, the sister of Thomas Wilson Dorr. They had five children.

During his period of ennui prior to joining the bench, Ames wrote Arthur Ledgeley or Some Passages in the Life of a Lawyer: A Love Story, an unpublished romance novel he dedicated to his wife. He died in Providence on December 20, 1865.

Political offices
Preceded by William R. Staples	Chief Justice of the Rhode Island Supreme Court; 1856–1865	Succeeded by Charles S. Bradley
