= C. J. Stevens =

American author (1927–2021)

Clysle Julius (C. J.) Stevens
- Born: December 8, 1927; Smithfield, Maine, U.S.
- Died: December 9, 2021 (aged 94); Surfside Beach, South Carolina
- Education: B.S (1953)
- Alma mater: Teachers College of Connecticut (now Central Connecticut State University)
- Occupation: Writer
- Spouse: S.R. (née Taschlisky) Stevens
- Writing career
- Pen name: John Stevens Wade
- Period: 20th and 21st centuries
- Genres: Poetry, short stories, non-fiction, and biography
- Notable works: The Uncertain Cartographer: selected poems of CJ Stevens (1981); The Next Bend in the River: Gold Mining in Maine (1989); The Cornish Nightmare (D. H. Lawrence in Cornwall) (1996); The Supernatural Side of Maine (2002)
- Website: johnwade.com

Clysle Julius (C.J.) Stevens (8 December 1927 – 9 December 2021) was a writer. He published over 30 books (including poetry, short stories, non-fiction, and biography), and was published in hundreds of magazines. The United States Library of Congress contains a special collection of his works.

In 1998, the Portland Press Herald described him as "versatile and charismatic". Stevens also translated others' works into English from other languages, including Dutch and Flemish.

== Biography ==
=== Early life ===
Stevens was born in Smithfield, Maine, the son of Earl Wade and Leonora May (Witham) Stevens. He had his first poem published at age 13 in the Waterville Morning Sentinel, a Maine newspaper.

As a young man he enlisted in the U.S. Army in February 1946 for the duration of the war, plus six months. Afterward, he earned a B.S. in 1953 from Teachers College of Connecticut (now known as Central Connecticut State University).

=== Writing career ===
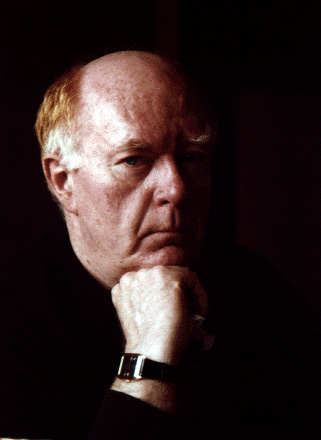
C. J. Stevens, Author

The United States Library of Congress contains a special collection of Stevens' works. He published over 30 books, including poetry, short stories, non-fiction, and biography. He said he submitted his poems "haphazardly" over the years to publishers, being a contributor to The Nation, Prairie Schooner, Literary Review, Modern Age, The Post-Crescent, and other publications. By 1990, his poems and stories had also been published in 400 magazines, and more than 50 anthologies and texts.

==== Poetry ====
Stevens wrote nearly 20 books of poetry. His first book of published poetry, and his only book published under the name "Clysle Stevens", was Loose Stones: First Poems, published by Hitchcock Press in 1954. He published his next 13 books of poetry under the pen name "John Stevens Wade".

These were

- Climbs of Uncertainty (New Athenaeum Press, 1961),
- Northeast (Hammond Press, 1963),
- Two from Where it Snows, with John Judson (Northeast Chapbook Series, 1964),
- Drowning in The Dark (The Group, 1965),
- Small World (The Group, 1965),
- Gallery: Drawings by Tom Ricciardi (Poet & Printer, 1969),
- The Backhouse (Funch Press, 1971),
- The Cats in the Colosseum (Crossing Press, 1972, ISBN 0-912278-23-4),
- Well Water and Daisies (Northeast/Juniper Books, 1974, ISBN 1-55780-012-X),
- Each to His Own Ground (Juniper Press, 1976, ISBN 1-55780-053-7),
- Some of My Best Friends Are Trees (Sparrow Press, 1978)
- Homecoming (Icarus Press, 1979), and
- Up North (Juniper Press, 1980, ISBN 1-55780-061-8)

He then began publishing under the name "C.J. Stevens", and produced

- The Uncertain Cartographer: selected poems of CJ Stevens (Oracle Press, 1981),
- Borderland Traveller: Poems, (Oracle Press, 1985, ISBN 0-88127-038-5),
- Beginnings and Other Poems (J. Wade, 1989, ISBN 0-9623934-3-6),
- Circling at the Chain's Length (J. Wade, 1991, ISBN 0-9623934-4-4),
- Hang-Ups: poems (J. Wade, 1993, ISBN 1-882425-01-4),
- Selected Poems (J. Wade, 1995, ISBN 1-882425-04-9),
- Shepherd without Sheep (John Wade, 2001, ISBN 1-882425-15-4), and
- Collected Poems (John Wade, 2002, ISBN 1-882425-19-7).

His poetry also appeared in the works of other people. For example, his poetry appeared, under the name John Stevens Wade, in

- 28 Poems (Sumac Press, 1966),
- Flowering after Frost: the anthology of contemporary New England poetry (Michael McMahon (editor), Branden Books, 1975, ISBN 0-8283-1547-7),
- Talking animals (Charley Davey (editor), Juniper Press, 1978),
- So many heads, so many wits (Janet Sobieski, Wolfgang Mieder (editors), Dept. of German and Russian, University of Vermont, 2005, ISBN 0-9770731-0-6).

His poetry also appeared under "C. J. Stevens" in

- The Art of Bicycling: A Treasury of Poems (Justin Daniel Belmont (editor), Breakaway Books, 2005, ISBN 1-891369-56-3).

==== Short stories ====
Stevens wrote two collections of short stories, both under the name C. J. Stevens. They are The Folks from Greeley's Mill and other Maine Stories ( J. Wade, 1992, ISBN 0-9623934-8-7), and Confessions: New and Selected Stories (John Wade, 1998, ISBN 1-882425-10-3).

==== Non-fiction ====
Stevens and his wife began prospecting in about 1970, and found gold in more than 30 rivers. When his book The Next Bend in the River: Gold Mining in Maine (John Wade, 1989, ISBN 0-9623934-0-1) about discovering gold in Maine was published, many readers were amazed to learn that gold nuggets can be found by panning certain rivers.

He also wrote the related book, Memoirs of a Maine Gold Hunter (John Wade, 2005, ISBN 1-882425-22-7), about panning for gold and searching for treasure.

He wrote additional non-fiction including:

- Maine Mining Adventures (Wade, 1994, ISBN 1-882425-03-0),
- The Buried Treasures of Maine (Wade, 1997, ISBN 1-882425-09-X),
- One Day with a Goat Herd (Wade, 1992, ISBN 0-9623934-6-0), about goat herding,
- The Supernatural Side of Maine (Wade, 2002, ISBN 1-882425-16-2).

In his book about the supernatural in Maine, he d out-of-body experiences, witches, haunted houses, alien abductions, and people from Maine who faced the supernatural. in 2002.

==== Biographies ====
Stevens wrote a series of biographies starting in the late 1980s. Two were biographies connected to a period in D. H. Lawrence's life in Cornwall

- Lawrence at Tregerthen (D. H. Lawrence) (Whitston Pub. Co., 1988, ISBN 0-87875-348-6),
- The Cornish Nightmare (D. H. Lawrence in Cornwall) (Whitston Pub. Co., 1996, ISBN 0-87875-348-6), about D.H. Lawrence and the war years.

In 2000 Stevens published a biography of the American writer Erskine Caldwell,

- Storyteller: A Life of Erskine Caldwell (John Wade, 2000, ISBN 1-882425-11-1), and

in 2004 a biography of English primitive artist Bryan Pearce.

- The Miracle of Bryan Pearce (John Wade, 2004, ISBN 1-882425-20-0), about a brain-damaged boy named Bryan Pearce who became a nationally acclaimed artist.

=== Translations ===
Stevens also had a career as a translator, translating a number of books to English from Dutch and Flemish. Under the name John Stevens Wade he translated Terrena Troubahi, by Paul De Vree (Ganglia Press) in 1960, Poems from the Lowlands (Small Pond) from the Dutch and Flemish in 1967, Thirty-One New Poets (Schreiber (editor), Hill & Wang Pub, 1968, ISBN 0-8090-0090-3), Waterland: A Gathering from Holland (Holmgangers Press, 1977, translator from the Dutch), and From the Flemish of Gaston Burssens (Arts End Books, 1982, ISBN 0-933292-11-2) Subsequently, translating under the name C. J. Stevens, he translated One Score-And-Two Years of Uncommon Fanfare (John Edward Westburg (editor), Westburg Asso Pub, 1986, ISBN 0-87423-040-3), and collected and translated Poems from Holland and Belgium (John Wade, 1999, ISBN 1-882425-13-8).

=== Career outside writing ===
Over his lifetime, Stevens had many jobs: as a farmer, deliveryman, selectman, and assistant manager at Carvel Hall, an Annapolis landmark. Stevens lived overseas for five years, two of those in the Netherlands, moving approximately every six months to countries including Ireland, England, Portugal, and Malta.

His interest in images led him to become a poet and a writer. It also led to a second career in painting, and along with his writing, he compiles a photographer's portfolio. Photographs of his paintings may be seen at this photography site. His biographies and other non-fiction are unusual, in that in all cases he had access to either the subject or to someone intimate with the subject–a wife, friend, lover, or mother.

Stevens also lectured and traveled extensively, living in Phillips, Maine, in Weld, Maine, in Temple, Maine, and in South Carolina with his Dutch wife Stella Rachel (née Taschlicky) Stevens, whom he married on June 13, 1954.
