= ESC =

ESC may refer to:

== Arts and entertainment ==
- Eurovision Song Contest, an annual international song competition
- The Electric Swing Circus, a British band
- Extreme Sports Channel, a television channel
- Egyptian Satellite Channel, an Egyptian television channel

== Science and engineering ==
=== Computing ===
- Esc key on a keyboard
- Escape character in the C0 control code set
- Escape sequence
- Extended static checking

=== Concepts and technologies ===
- Einstein summation convention
- Electronic speed control
- Electronic stability control
- Embryonic stem cell
- Environmental stress cracking

=== Organizations ===
- Electrical Safety Council, now Electrical Safety First, a British charity
- European Society of Cardiology
- European Society of Criminology

== Education ==
- Ecole Supérieure de Commerce, a type of French business school
- Edison State College, now Florida SouthWestern State College
- Educational service center
- Empire State College of the State University of New York
- English Subject Centre, a British English-language educational organization
- European School, Culham, in Oxfordshire, England
- European Solidarity Centre, a museum and library in Gdańsk, Poland
- European Solidarity Corps, volunteering program by the European Commission
- European Space Camp
- Eyring Science Center, a science building at Brigham Young University in Provo, Utah, United States

== Government and politics ==
- Economic and Social Council (Arab League)
- European Social Charter
- Essential Services Commission (Victoria)
- Essential Services Commission of South Australia

== Sports ==
- Ekenäs Sport Club, a football club in Finland
- Empire Supporters Club, a fan club of the New York Red Bulls
- Equitable Stroke Control, in golf
- Essex Senior Cup, an English football competition
- Essex Skating Club, in New Jersey
- European Shooting Confederation

== Other uses ==
- Esc, Aesc or Oisc of Kent, King of Kent, 474–516 AD
- Delta County Airport, Escanaba, Michigan, by IATA code
- Electronic Systems Center, a former product center of the United States Air Force
- Energy Savings Certificate, a document certifying that a certain reduction of energy consumption has been obtained
- Expeditionary Sustainment Command
- Guggenmos ESC, a German hang glider

== See also ==
- Extremely Severe Cyclonic Storm (ESCS), a category of North Indian Ocean tropical cyclone
