= Handicap (golf) =

Measure of a golfer's playing ability

A 1920s comic strip by Tad Dorgan depicting golfers discussing handicap assignments.

A golf handicap is a numerical measure of a golfer's demonstrated ability, or potential ability, that is used to enable players of different abilities to compete against one another. Better players are those with the lowest handicaps.

Historically, rules relating to handicaps have varied from country to country with many different systems in force around the world. Because of incompatibilities and difficulties in translating between systems, the sport's governing bodies, the USGA and The R&A, working with the various existing handicapping authorities, devised a new World Handicap System (WHS) which began to be introduced globally in 2020.

== History ==
The earliest record of golf handicapping is thought to be from the late 17th century, in a diary kept by Thomas Kincaid, who was a student in Edinburgh, Scotland, although the word handicap would not come into use in golf until the late 19th century. The number of strokes to be given and the holes on which they would be in effect was negotiated between competing golfers prior to the start of play. According to The Golfer's Manual by Henry Brougham Farnie, examples of agreed terms included "third-one" (one stroke every three holes), "half-one" (one stroke every two holes), "one more" (a stroke a hole) and "two more" (two strokes a hole).

During the late 19th century, taking the difference between the average of a golfer's best three scores during the year and par became the most widely used method of handicapping in England and Scotland. As the sport grew, so did discontent with the fairness of handicapping, with less proficient players being particularly unhappy as it was much less likely for them to play to the standard of their three-score average. Another issue was the lack of consideration in the system for the varying difficulties of different courses which meant the handicap was not very portable.

In an attempt to remedy the problems with the basic handicap system and the many variations being used, the authorities in Great Britain and Ireland sought to standardize. One of the first standard and equitable handicap systems was introduced by the Ladies Golf Union (LGU) in the 1890s. This was largely achieved by means of union-assigned course ratings, instead of clubs using their own. It was not until the formation of the British Golf Unions Joint Advisory Committee in 1924 that the men's game fully coordinated to create an equitable handicap system, that included a uniform course rating, throughout Great Britain and Ireland; the Standard Scratch Score and Handicapping Scheme was introduced in 1926.

In the United States, there was a single authority governing the sport, the USGA, which made moving to a single standard handicapping scheme somewhat easier. Introduced in 1911, the first national handicap system was based on the British three-score average system. The biggest development was a "par rating" system that assessed the average good score of a scratch golfer on every course, which made the handicap more portable. It also made clear that a player's handicap was intended to reflect their potential rather than average play. Having initially allowed clubs to determine their own par ratings, the USGA quickly changed their minds and began assigning ratings. The USGA Handicap System has further developed through the years, with an increase in the number of scores used for handicap calculations, the introduction of Equitable Stroke Control, and improvements to the course rating system. However, the most significant change was the creation of the slope rating system, which enabled handicaps to account for differences in difficulty between scratch and bogey golfers. USGA Course and Slope Ratings now form the basis of many other handicap systems.

As the sport grew globally, associations around the world each created or adapted their own rules relating to handicaps. By the early 21st century, there were six major recognized handicapping systems in operation around the world: USGA Handicap System, EGA Handicap System, CONGU Unified Handicap System, Golf Australia Handicap System, South African Handicap System, and Argentinian Handicap System. While these systems share some common features, e.g. most use a common course rating system, they are not easily portable because their differences create difficulties in converting handicaps between systems. In order to eliminate these problems the USGA and The R&A, working with the various existing handicapping authorities, devised a new World Handicap System which was phased in globally in 2020.

== Overview ==
Amateur golfers who are members of golf clubs are generally eligible for official handicaps on payment of the prevailing regional and national association annual fees. Official handicaps are administered by golf clubs with the associations often providing additional peer reviewing for low handicaps. Other systems, often free of charge, are available to golfers who are ineligible for official handicaps. Handicap systems are not generally used in professional golf. A golfer whose handicap is zero is referred to as a scratch golfer, and one whose handicap is approximately 18 as a bogey golfer.

While the USGA administers its own handicapping system, the administration of handicapping systems in countries affiliated to The R&A is the responsibility of the national golf associations of those countries. These bodies have different methods of producing handicaps but they are all generally based on calculating an individual player's playing ability from their recent history of rounds. Therefore, a handicap is not fixed but is regularly adjusted to increases or decreases in a player's scoring. Some systems (e.g. World Handicap System, USGA, European Golf Association) involve calculation of a playing handicap which is dependent on the course being played and set of tees that are being used, whereas others (e.g. CONGU's Unified Handicap System) just use the allocated handicap rounded to the nearest whole number.

Contrary to popular opinion, a player's handicap is intended to reflect a player's potential or "average best", not a player's overall average score. Statistically, low handicappers will play to their handicap more often because they are likely to be more consistent than higher handicappers.

== Features of handicapping systems ==
=== Scoring ===
The total number of strokes taken for a hole (or round) before accounting for a golfer's handicap is called the gross score for that hole (or round), and the number of strokes taken after subtracting any handicap allowance is called the net score.

Note that the gross score in 'world handicap system' is calculated as the number of strokes taken for a hole + the handicap allowance for that hole. The adjusted gross score in 'world handicap system' is the gross score adjusted such that the maximum on any particular hole is the number of strokes taken for a hole + the handicap allowance for that hole + 2 strokes (i.e. net double bogey).

In handicap stroke play competitions, a golfer's playing handicap is subtracted from the total number of strokes taken to produce a net score, which is then used to determine the final results. In handicap Stableford competitions, a player's handicap is distributed according to predetermined hole ratings (stroke index) and strokes deducted accordingly from each hole score before calculating the points for that hole. In match play, the handicap difference between players (or teams) is used to determine the number of strokes the high handicap player should receive from the low handicapper during the playing of their round; each of these strokes are received on the lowest numbered stroke index holes. Stroke allowances may sometimes be reduced by a set percentage in order to maintain the level playing field; this is especially common in pairs and team competitions.

=== Course Rating ===
Course Rating, (Standard) Scratch Score, Scratch Rating, and Standard Rating are largely equivalent ratings that are used to indicate the average "good score" by a scratch golfer for a set of tees on a golf course. For a par 72 course, the course rating is generally between 67 and 77. There are different methods of calculating the Course Rating, with the length of the course and its obstacles being the biggest factors. Some systems use only these two, or even length alone, but most modern handicapping systems now use the USGA Course Rating system which assesses the difficulty of all aspects of the course, e.g. altitude, wide or narrow fairways, length of any rough, the size and contours of the greens, etc.

Some handicapping systems provide for an adjustment to the course rating to account for variations in playing conditions on any given day, e.g. course setup and weather, and it is against this adjusted rating that handicaps are assessed and maintained. Examples of adjusted ratings are Playing Conditions Calculation (World Handicap System), Competition Scratch Score (CONGU Unified Handicapping System), Daily Scratch Rating (Golf Australia Handicap System), and Calculated Rating (South African Handicap System).

Analogous to course rating is the bogey rating, which is a measure of the playing difficulty of a course for a bogey golfer.

=== Slope Rating ===
Devised by the USGA, the Slope Rating of a golf course describes the relative difficulty of a course for a bogey golfer compared to a scratch golfer. Slope Ratings are in the range 55 to 155, with a course of standard relative difficulty having a rating of 113; the higher the number, the more relatively difficult the course is.

=== Playing or course handicap ===
In most major handicapping systems, a golfer does not use their exact handicap (or handicap index) directly, but use it to produce their playing or course handicap. For some systems, this means simply rounding the exact handicap to the nearest whole number; however, systems that use slope ratings require a more complex calculation to produce a course handicap with some also factoring in the course rating:

$$\mbox{Course handicap} = \frac{ ( \mbox{handicap index} \times \mbox{slope rating} ) }{ \mbox{113}}$$

or

$$\mbox{Course handicap} = \frac{ ( \mbox{handicap index} \times \mbox{slope rating} ) }{ \mbox{113}} + ( \mbox{course rating} - \mbox{par} )$$

The USGA and Golf Australia systems use the first calculation; the WHS, EGA, and Golf RSA systems use the second. Under CONGU's Unified Handicapping System the exact handicap is rounded to the nearest whole number to produce the playing handicap, and in the Argentinian system the exact handicap is used directly.

A playing handicap may also refer to the stroke allowance for a given competition dependent on playing format, and is generally calculated as a percentage of the course handicap.

=== Stroke Index ===
The Stroke index is a number that has been assigned to each hole on a golf course, and usually printed on the scorecard, to indicate on which holes handicap strokes should be applied. On an 18-hole course, each hole is assigned a different number from 1 to 18 (1 to 9 on a 9-hole course). The lowest numbers are usually given to the holes where a higher handicapper is most likely to benefit, and the highest numbers to the holes they are least likely to benefit. Odd numbers will be allocated to either the first or second 9-holes (and even numbers to the other) to ensure a balanced distribution of handicap strokes, and guidelines generally recommend avoiding having the lowest numbers at the start or end of each nine in order to prevent early stroke allowances in playoffs between golfers with similar handicaps or strokes going unused if they are at the end.

=== Maximum hole score ===
Most of the commonly used handicap systems seek to reduce the impact of very high scores on one or more individual holes on the calculation and updating of handicaps. This is achieved by setting a maximum score on each hole, which is only used for handicapping purposes; i.e. it is not used for determining results of competitions or matches. This maximum hole score is either a fixed number or a net score relative to par. Equitable Stroke Control (ESC) and net double bogey (also called Stableford Points Adjustments) are the two most common mechanisms for defining a maximum hole score.

=== Handicap differential ===
Handicap (or score) differentials are a feature of many handicapping systems. They are a standardized measure of a golfers performance, adjusted to take account of the course being played. Normally the overall score will be adjusted prior to the calculation, e.g. by means of ESC or net double bogey. The course rating may also be adjusted to take account of conditions on the day.

For handicapping systems that use course and slope ratings, a typical calculation using the score (see above) is as follows:

$$\mbox{Handicap differential} = \frac{ ( \mbox{adjusted score} - \mbox{course rating} ) \times \mbox{113}}{ \mbox{slope rating}}$$

The differentials are used both to calculate initial handicaps and maintain existing ones, by taking a mean average of a set number of the best recent differentials (e.g. the USGA system uses the best 10 differentials from the last 20 scores).

For other handicapping systems, the differentials are simply the difference between the (adjusted) gross or net scores and a specified standard rating (e.g. course rating, standard scratch score, etc.), and they are used in different ways to maintain handicaps.

=== Peer review ===
In golf clubs, peer review is usually managed by an elected Handicap Secretary who, supported by a small committee, conducts an Annual Review of the handicaps of all members and assesses ad hoc requests from individual members (usually when age or medium to long-term infirmity affects their playing ability). This gives uniformity to handicapping across their club for the setting and maintenance of handicaps with the objective of establishing fair competition between golfers of all abilities.

At the regional level, peer review is extended to include rigorous validation of the handicap returns of low handicap golfers. This ensures that only golfers of an appropriate standard gain entry to their elite tournaments. Occasionally, golfers are excluded from the elite game as a consequence of being found to abuse the system. To a degree, these regional bodies also monitor the performance of and provide training for Handicap Secretaries at the club level.

Nationally, the peer review is extended further to assessing golfers from external jurisdictions for their suitability for entry into their elite international events. They also play a large part in periodic reviews of the handicapping system itself to improve it for the future.

== Handicapping systems ==
=== World Handicap System ===
Due to the many different handicapping systems in use around the world, and the many inconsistencies within them, which makes it difficult to compete on an equal footing where another handicap system is in use, the sports major governing bodies, in 2011 The R&A and the USGA began work on creation of a single uniform handicapping system to be used everywhere. In February 2018, they announced that the World Handicap System (WHS) would be launched in 2020. Once introduced, the World Handicap System will continue to be governed by The R&A and the USGA with the six existing major handicapping authorities (the USGA, the Council of National Golf Unions (CONGU) in Great Britain and Ireland, the European Golf Association (EGA), Golf Australia, the South African Golf Association (SAGA), and the Argentine Golf Association (AAG)) administering the system at a local level.

The WHS is based on the USGA Course and Slope Rating system, and largely follows the USGA Handicap System while also incorporating features from the six major existing handicap systems. For example, 8 differentials (like the Golf Australia system) are used after net double bogey adjustments (like the CONGU and EGA systems) for handicap calculations, and the WHS course/playing handicap includes a course rating adjustment (like the EGA system). For players with current handicaps, their handicap records in the old systems will be used to produce WHS handicaps; the expectation is that most players will at most see a difference of one or two strokes, if any.

A new WHS handicap requires several scores to be submitted; the recommendation is a minimum of 54 holes made up of any number of 9 or 18-hole rounds in order to achieve a reasonable fair and accurate result, although handicaps may be issued from a smaller sample. Handicap adjustments will be made upon submission of any 9 or 18-hole scores with updates published daily; unlike some other systems both competitive and recreational rounds may be submitted by all players (e.g. CONGU's Unified Handicapping System only allows submission of non-qualifying scores by golfers in Category 2 or above). Ongoing handicaps are based on the average of the best 8 differentials, but with an "anchor" to prevent rapid increases that would not necessarily reflect the player's true potential. There is also a hole limit of "net double bogey" for handicapping purposes in order to prevent one or two bad holes from having a disproportionate effect.

==== World Handicap System overview ====
A WHS handicap is calculated with a specific arithmetic formula that approximates how many strokes above or below par a player might be able to play, based on the eight best scores of their last twenty rounds. The calculation has several variables, including: the player's scores from their most recent rounds, the course rating, and the slope rating.

A score differential is calculated from each of the scores after any net double bogey adjustments (an adjustment which allows for a maximum number of strokes per hole based on the player's course handicap) have been applied, using the following formula:

$$\mbox{18-hole score differential} = \frac{\mbox{113}}{\mbox{slope rating}} \times ({\mbox{adjusted gross score}} - {\mbox{course rating}} - {\mbox{PCC adjustment}})$$
$$\mbox{9-hole score differential} = \frac{\mbox{113}}{\mbox{slope rating}} \times ({\mbox{adjusted gross score}} - {\mbox{course rating}} - ({\mbox{0.5}} \times {\mbox{PCC adjustment}}))$$

9 hole scores may be submitted for WHS calculation, with an expected score for the player's handicap index is used to produce an equivalent 18-hole score differential.

Incomplete 18-hole rounds due to injury, illness, fading light, hole closures, or other reasons acceptable to a handicap committee may be acceptable for WHS calculation providing at least 10 holes have been completed.

The score differentials are rounded to one decimal place, and the best 8 from the last 20 submitted scores are then averaged and rounded to one decimal place to produce the handicap index. Initial handicaps are calculated from a minimum of five scores using adjustments that limit each hole score to a maximum of $(\mbox{par} + \mbox{5})$. If there are at least 5 but fewer than 20 qualifying scores available, the handicap index is calculated using a set number or differentials according to how many scores are available, with an additional adjustment made to that average in some circumstances.

Number of rounds	Differentials to use	Adjustment to average
3	lowest 1	-2.0
4	lowest 1	-1.0
5	lowest 1	0
6	lowest 2	-1.0
7 or 8	lowest 2	0
9 to 11	lowest 3	0
12 to 14	lowest 4	0
15 or 16	lowest 5	0
17 or 18	lowest 6	0
19	lowest 7	0

The basic formula for calculating the handicap index is as follows (where $n$ is the number of differentials to use), with the result rounded to one decimal place:

$$\mbox{Handicap index} = (\frac{1}{n}\sum_{x=1}^{n} \mbox{Differential}_x) + \mbox{adjustment}$$

The handicap index is not used directly for playing purposes, but used to calculate a course handicap according to the slope rating of the set of tees being used with an adjustment based on the difference between the course rating and par. The result is rounded to the nearest whole number. For competitions, the unrounded course handicap is converted to a playing handicap by applying a handicap allowance, dependent on the format of play.

$$\mbox{Course Handicap} = \frac{ ( \mbox{Handicap index} \times \mbox{Slope Rating} )}{113} + ( \mbox{course rating} - \mbox{par} )$$

The WHS contains measures to reduce a handicap index more quickly in the case of exceptional scoring, and also to prevent a handicap index from rising too quickly. This is done by means of "soft" and "hard" caps based on the lowest index during the previous 365 days; the soft cap reduces increases above 3.0 to 50%, and the hard cap limits increases to 5.0. Updates to a golfer's handicap index are issued daily.

Many elements of WHS have flexibility which allows for local authorities to determine their own settings, but the basic handicap index calculation remains the same. Examples include: 9-hole scores may be scaled-up rather than combined; $( \mbox{course rating} - \mbox{par} )$ may be omitted from the course handicap calculation; and the rounded course handicap may be used in the playing handicap calculation.

The World Handicap System allows a player to submit Keegan Cards under Lawson Rules. This allows a player to register a qualifying score during social play which will count for the players handicap. The Lawson Rule allows a playing partner to authorise the score as having been submitted in line with the strict requirements for Keegan Cards.

=== USGA Handicap System ===
The first handicap system to be introduced by the USGA was largely the work of Leighton Calkins, who based it on the British "three-score average" system where the handicap was calculated as the average of the best three scores to par in the last year. The key difference was the introduction of a par rating (later known as course rating), which was based on the ability of leading amateur Jerome Travers, to account for variances in the playing difficulty of different courses. After initially allowing clubs to determine their own ratings, at the behest of Calkins the USGA quickly began assigning ratings centrally. Course ratings were rounded to the nearest whole number until 1967, when they started being given to one decimal place.

In 1947, the number of scores used to calculate handicaps was increased to the best 10 from all scores ever recorded subject to a minimum of 50. However this was not uniformly implemented, with regional associations disagreeing on the total number of rounds to be considered. In 1958, the USGA specified that the best 10 from 25 scores would be used. This was reduced to 10 from 20 in 1967, which remains to this day although a further adjustment was made with the introduction of a "Bonus of Excellence" multiplier to equalize handicaps and give better players a marginal advantage. Originally 85%, the multiplier was changed to 96% after being seen to favor better players too heavily. In 1974, Equitable Stroke Control was adopted in order to eliminate the effect of very high individual hole scores on handicap calculations.

With the system still not accounting for variances in playing difficulty for golfers of different abilities, in 1979 the USGA set to work on how to address the issue with the creation of the Handicap Research Team. The result of their work was the creation of what is now the Slope system. Slope was gradually introduced, firstly in Colorado in 1982, before being implemented nationally from 1987. The USGA then set about making further refinements to the course rating system, which at the time was still largely dependent on length, to take account of many other factors affecting scoring ability for a scratch golfer. The USGA Course and Slope Rating system is now used by most of the world's major handicapping systems.

The USGA Handicap System is used throughout the jurisdiction of the USGA (i.e. the United States and Mexico), and is also licensed for use in many other countries around the world, e.g. Canada. The USGA has often resorted to the courts to protect the integrity of its handicap system. In one such case, the California Court of Appeal (First District) summarized the system's history:

The USGA was founded in 1894. One of its chief contributions to the game of golf in the United States has been its development and maintenance since 1911 of the USGA handicap system ... designed to enable individual golf players of different abilities to compete fairly with one another. Because permitting individual golfers to issue their handicaps to themselves would inevitably lead to inequities and abuse, the peer review provided by authorized golf clubs and associations has always been an essential part of the [system]. Therefore, to protect the integrity and credibility of its [handicap system], the USGA has consistently followed a policy of only permitting authorized golf associations and clubs to issue USGA handicaps ... In 1979, USGA assembled a handicap research team to investigate widespread criticisms of USGA's then-existing handicap formula. The research team invested approximately a decade and up to $2 million conducting intensive analysis and evaluation of the various factors involved in developing a more accurate and satisfactory [system]. As a result, the research team developed new handicap formulas ... designed to measure the overall difficulty of golf courses, compare individual golfers with other golfers of all abilities, take account of differences between tournament and casual play, and adjust aberrant scores on individual holes. USGA subsequently adopted and implemented these new [f]ormulas between 1987 and 1993.

==== USGA Handicap System overview ====
A USGA handicap is calculated with a specific arithmetic formula that approximates how many strokes above or below par a player might be able to play, based on the ten best scores of their last twenty rounds. The calculation has several variables: the player's scores from their most recent rounds, and the course and slope ratings from those rounds.

A handicap differential is calculated from each of the scores after Equitable Stroke Control (ESC), an adjustment which allows for a maximum number of strokes per hole based on the player's course handicap, has been applied using the following formula:

$$\mbox{Handicap differential} = \frac{ ( \mbox{ESC adjusted score} - \mbox{course rating} ) \times \mbox{113}}{ \mbox{slope rating}}$$

The handicap differentials are rounded to one decimal place, and the best 10 from the last 20 submitted scores are then averaged, before being multiplied by 0.96 (the "bonus of excellence") and truncated to one decimal place to produce the handicap index. Initial handicaps are calculated from a minimum of five scores using ESC adjustments based on the course handicap corresponding to a handicap index of 36.4 for men or 40.4 for women. If there are at least 5 but fewer than 20 qualifying scores available, the handicap index is calculated using a set number or differentials according to how many scores are available.

Number of rounds	Differentials to use
5 or 6	lowest 1
7 or 8	lowest 2
9 or 10	lowest 3
11 or 12	lowest 4
13 or 14	lowest 5
15 or 16	lowest 6
17	lowest 7
18	lowest 8
19	lowest 9

The basic formula for calculating the handicap index is as follows (where $n$ is the number of differentials to use), with the result truncated to one decimal place:

$$\mbox{Handicap index} = \frac{0.96}{n}\sum_{x=1}^{n} \mbox{Differential}_x$$

The handicap index is not used directly for playing purposes, but used to calculate a course handicap according to the slope rating of the set of tees being used. The result is rounded to the nearest whole number.

$$\mbox{Course Handicap} = \frac{ ( \mbox{Handicap index} \times \mbox{Slope Rating} )}{113}$$

Updates to a golfer's handicap index are issued periodically, generally once or twice per month depending on the local state and regional golf associations.

=== CONGU Unified Handicapping System ===
Following a meeting of the four men's golf unions of Great Britain and Ireland in York arranged by The Royal and Ancient Golf Club of St Andrews in 1924, the British Golf Unions Joint Advisory Committee (later Council of National Golf Unions) was formed. The organization was tasked with creating a handicapping system that would be equitable to golfers of varying ability, and as a result the Standard Scratch Score and Handicapping Scheme was devised. The system was introduced in 1926, and used a "scratch score" system to rate courses, taking account that courses may play easier or more difficult than par.

A new system was introduced in 1983, which incorporated features of the Australian system. This was further revised in 1989 with the introduction of the Competition Scratch Score (CSS), an adjustment to the Standard Scratch Score (SSS), to take account of variances in course conditions (setup, weather, etc.) on a given day. Further significant changes came in 1993 (buffer zones) and 1997 (Stableford Points Adjustment). In 2002, the Council of National Golf Unions (CONGU) and the Ladies' Golf Union (LGU) began working together (the LGU had adopted a system similar to that of CONGU in 1998) and in February 2004 the Unified Handicapping System (UHS) came into force.

The Unified Handicapping System is used to manage handicaps for both men and women who are members of affiliated golf clubs in the United Kingdom and the Republic of Ireland. The system is published by CONGU and administered by each of the individual unions on behalf of their members, with handicaps being managed locally by someone at each club; this person normally holds the position of competitions or handicap secretary.

==== Unified Handicapping System overview ====
Under the Unified Handicapping System, initial handicaps are allocated based on returned scores from 54 holes, usually three 18-hole rounds. The number of strokes taken on each hole is adjusted to maximum of double the par of the hole before adding up the scores; adjustments were previously 2 over par for men and 3 over par for women. The best of the "adjusted gross differentials" (AGD) between the adjusted score and the Standard Scratch Score (SSS) is taken to calculate the initial handicap using the following formula, with the result truncated to give a whole number:

$$\mbox{Initial handicap} = \frac{ ( \mbox{Lowest AGD} + ( \mbox{Lowest AGD} \times \mbox{0.13}) ) }{ \mbox{1.237}}$$

Adjustments may be made to the initial handicap should it be deemed necessary to ensure it is reasonably fair. Handicaps are given to one decimal place and divided into categories with the lowest handicaps being in Category 1. Prior to 2018, the highest handicaps were in Category 4 for men, with a maximum of 28.0, and Category 5 for women, with a maximum of 36.0, with provision for higher "club" or "disability" handicaps up to a limit of 54.0 for those who cannot play to these lower limits. In 2018, handicap limits were standardized at 54.0 and a Category 5 was introduced for men, and a new Category 6 for all, replacing the club and disability category (see table below). The exact handicap is rounded to the nearest whole number to give the playing handicap. Many handicap competitions still have maximum limits of 28 for men and 36 for women.

For all qualifying scores that are returned, adjustments are made to a players exact handicap based on the Competition Scratch Score (CSS). All hole scores are first adjusted to a maximum of net 2-over par with handicap strokes being used per the stroke index published on the scorecard; this is called Stableford or net double-bogey adjustment. Every stroke the adjusted net score is below the CSS triggers a reduction dependent on the players handicap category; for Category 1 this is 0.1 per stroke, for Category 2 it is 0.2, etc. Should the adjusted net score exceed the CSS, there is a buffer zone equivalent to the handicap category before a 0.1 increase is applied, which is the same for all categories; for Category 1 there is 1 stroke buffer, for Category 2 it is 2 strokes, etc. The Competition Scratch Score is an adjustment to the Standard Scratch Score computed from all scores returned and is in the range $(SSS - 1)$ to $(SSS + 3)$ with provision for "reduction only" when scoring conditions have proved especially difficult.

Category	Exact handicap	Playing handicap	Reduction per stroke better than CSS	Increase for scores exceeding CSS + buffer	Buffer
1	≤5.4	≤5	0.1	0.1	1 stroke
2	5.5 to 12.4	6 to 12	0.2	0.1	2 strokes
3	12.5 to 20.4	13 to 20	0.3	0.1	3 strokes
4	20.5 to 28.4	21 to 28	0.4	0.1	4 strokes
5	28.5 to 36.4	29 to 36	0.5	0.1	5 strokes
6	36.5 to 54.0	37 to 54	0.6	0.1	6 strokes

In addition to playing in qualifying competitions, golfers in Category 2 and above may also submit a number of supplementary scores in order to maintain their handicap; primarily a feature to accommodate golfers who play in few competitions and allow them to maintain current handicaps, it is also used by people who wish to try and get their handicap down while they are playing well. There are other mechanisms in the system to reduce or increase handicaps more quickly. Every year all handicaps are reviewed and adjusted if necessary to ensure they remain fair and accurate. In addition, any very good scores are monitored throughout the year and an exceptional scoring reduction may be applied if certain triggers are reached.

Historically calculating the CSS and any handicap adjustments was done manually by means of published tables, but this is now computerized with handicaps being published to a Centralised Database of Handicaps (CDH).

=== EGA Handicap System ===
The EGA Handicap System is the European Golf Association's method of evaluating golf abilities so that players of different standards can compete in handicap events on equal terms. It is based on Stableford scoring and has some similarities to both the CONGU system, with regards to handicap categories and adjustments, and to the USGA system, with regards to the use of course and slope ratings and calculating playing handicaps. The first version of the system was introduced in 2000.

==== EGA Handicap System overview ====
Under the EGA Handicap System, initial handicaps require just a single 9 or 18-hole score recorded using the maximum handicap of 54. The handicap is then calculated from the number of Stableford points scored.

$$\mbox{Initial handicap} =  \mbox{54} - ( \mbox{Stableford points} - \mbox{36} )$$

EGA handicaps are given to one decimal place and divided into categories, with the lowest handicaps being in Category 1 and the highest in Category 6 (see table below). The handicap is not used directly for playing purposes and a calculation must be done to determine a "playing handicap" specific to the course being played and set of tees being used. For handicaps in categories 1 to 5, the formula is as follows with the result rounded to the nearest whole number:

$$\mbox{Playing handicap} = \frac{ ( \mbox{handicap index} \times \mbox{slope rating} ) }{ \mbox{113}} + ( \mbox{course rating} - \mbox{par} )$$

And for category 6 a "playing handicap differential" is used, which is equal to the playing handicap for a handicap index of 36.0:

$$\mbox{Playing handicap} = ( \mbox{handicap index} + \mbox{playing handicap differential} )$$

For all qualifying scores that are returned, adjustments are made to a players handicap index. All scores are first converted into Stableford points if necessary (i.e. rounds played using another scoring method, e.g. stroke play), effectively applying a net double bogey adjustment, and then for every point scored above the buffer zone there is a reduction applied to the players handicap index according to their handicap category; for Category 1 this is 0.1 per point, for Category 2 it is 0.2, etc. Should the number of points scored be below the buffer zone, a fixed increase of 0.1 is applied to the handicap index regardless of category. The EGA system also takes account of variations in playing difficulty on any given competition day by means of a Computed Buffer Adjustment (CBA) which adjusts the buffer zones by between −1 and +2 with provision for "reductions only" when scoring is especially difficult. The CBA replaced the previous Competition Stableford Adjustment method, which adjusted player's Stableford scores directly, in 2013.

Category	Handicap index	Buffer zone (Stableford points)	Reduction per point scored in excess of the buffer zone	Increase for scores below the buffer zone
1	≤4.4	35–36	0.1	0.1
2	4.5 to 11.4	34–36	0.2	0.1
3	11.5 to 18.4	33–36	0.3	0.1
4	18.5 to 26.4	32–36	0.4	0.1
5	26.5 to 36.0	31–36	0.5	0.1
6	≥37	-	1.0	-

In addition to playing in qualifying competitions, golfers in Category 2 and above may also submit a number of extra day scores in order to maintain their handicap. Handicaps are also reviewed annually and any necessary adjustments made.

=== Golf Australia Handicap System ===
The Golf Australia Handicap System is maintained on GOLF Link, which was a world-first computerized handicapping system developed by Golf Australia's predecessor, the Australian Golf Union (AGU) in the 1990s. When GOLF Link was first introduced it contained two key characteristics that set it apart from other world handicapping systems at the time:

1. It used a Calculated Course Rating (CCR) to determine how difficult the course was on the day, and upon which handicap adjustment was made.
2. It utilized a 'swipe' card that enabled a player to access their handicap from any GOLF Link terminal in Australia.

In April 2010 GA adopted the USGA calculation method using the average of the best 10 differentials of the player's past 20 total rounds, multiplied by 0.96. In September 2011 this was altered to the best 8 out of 20 rounds, multiplied by 0.93. The reasons for these changes were cited to restore equity between high and low handicaps. An ‘anchor' so that handicaps could not increase by more than 5 in a rolling 12-month period, slope ratings, and a more sophisticated version of CCR called the Daily Scratch Rating (DSR) were implemented on January 23, 2014.

==== GA Handicap System overview ====
The GA Handicap System is based on the Stableford scoring system, and uses slope and course rating (called "Scratch Rating"). For handicapping purposes, the scratch rating is adjusted to reflect scoring conditions ("Daily Scratch Rating"), and all scores are converted into Stableford points, called the Stableford Handicap Adjustment (SHA) and inherently applying net double bogey adjustments, regardless of the scoring system being used while playing.

Handicaps are calculated from the best 8 adjusted differentials, called "sloped played to" results, from the most recent 20 scores. Should there be 3 or more but fewer than 20 scores available, a specified number of "sloped played to" results are used, per the table below.

Number of scores	"Sloped played to" results to use
3 to 6	lowest 1
7 or 8	lowest 2
9 or 10	lowest 3
11 or 12	lowest 4
13 or 14	lowest 5
15 or 16	lowest 6
17 or 18	lowest 7
19 or 20	lowest 8

New handicaps require 3 18-hole scores to be submitted (or any combination of 9 and 18-hole scores totaling 54 holes played) using a "Temporary Daily Handicap" of 36 for men or 45 for women in order to calculate the necessary "sloped played to" results. "Sloped played to" results are calculated using the following formula and rounded to one decimal place:

$$\mbox{Sloped played to} = ( \mbox{Par} + \mbox{Daily handicap} - ( \mbox{Stableford points} - \mbox{36} ) - \mbox{Daily scratch rating}) \times \frac{ \mbox{113} }{ \mbox{Slope Rating}}$$

To calculate the GA handicap, the "sloped played to" results are averaged and multiplied by a factor of 0.93, which is intended to equalize the handicap in favor of better players. The formula for calculating a GA handicap is as follows (where $n$ is the number of differentials to use), with the result truncated to one decimal place:

$$\mbox{GA handicap} = \frac{0.93}{n}\sum_{x=1}^{n} \mbox{Sloped played to}_x$$

The GA handicap is used to create a "daily handicap", specific to the course and set of tees being used, using the following formula with the result rounded to the nearest whole number:

$$\mbox{Daily handicap} = \frac{ \mbox{GA handicap} \times \mbox{Slope Rating} }{ \mbox{113}}$$

=== South African Handicap System ===
Before 2018, the South African Handicap System used a proprietary course rating system without slope, called Standard Rating, which included specific calculations for length and altitude. Handicaps were calculated using the best 10 from the last 20 differentials, with differentials derived by means of a simple (Standard Rating − Adjusted Gross) formula. The system previously calculated handicaps against an adjusted Standard Rating (called Calculated Rating) but this was suspended in 2012. Playing handicaps were simply the exact handicap, rounded to the nearest whole number.

In September 2018, the renamed GolfRSA Handicap System adopted the USGA Course and Slope Rating system. This necessitated a few additional changes (e.g. playing handicap and differential calculations), but the system retained all other features (e.g. Adjusted Gross and no daily course rating adjustment). The playing handicap under the GolfRSA system includes the difference between the Course Rating and Par.

In October 2019, further changes were made which brought the GolfRSA Handicap System further into line with the upcoming World Handicap System. The changes introduced included reducing the number of differentials used in handicap calculations from 10 down to 8, net double bogey as the maximum score per hole, reducing the minimum number of valid 18-hole scores required for handicapping to three, and exceptional scoring reductions.

=== Argentinian Handicap System ===
The Argentine Golf Association (AAG) handicapping system is a relatively simple one, using only a course rating, without slope. New handicaps require the submission of scorecards from five 18-hole rounds (or ten 9-hole rounds). An initial handicap of 25 is normally used as a starting point, which is then adjusted based on the submitted scores. Handicaps are updated once every month, with current handicaps generated from a lookup table using the average of the best eight differentials from the last 16 rounds. Golfers simply use their exact handicap for playing purposes.

=== Other systems ===
For the handicapping of golfers who are ineligible for an official handicap, some system options are available:

==== Peoria System ====
The Peoria System was designed for the handicapping of all players competing in an event such as a charity or corporate golf day. Before play commences, the organisers secretly select 6 holes (in readiness for handicapping purposes later) from the course to be played. When players have completed their rounds, they apply the Peoria algorithm to their scores on the selected holes to determine their handicap for that round. They then subtract that handicap from their gross score to give their net score - and the winner is determined in the usual way.

==== Callaway System ====
The Callaway System was designed with the same objective as Peoria. The Callaway handicapping algorithm works by totaling a variable number of "worst" scores achieved (subject to a double-par limit) according to a simple table. A couple of adjustments are then made to this total to give the player's handicap, which is then applied to their gross score as normal.

==== Scheid System ====
The Scheid System is similar to the Callaway System, except a different version of the table is used.

==== System 36 ====
System 36 is a same-day handicapping system similar in function to Callaway System and Peoria System. Throughout the round, the golfer accrues points based on the following formula:

- Double bogey or worse: 0 points
- Bogey: 1 point
- Par or better: 2 points

At the end of the round, points earned are tallied. The total is subtracted from 36, and the resulting number is the golfer's handicap allowance. The golfer's net score can then be computed using their System 36 handicap allowance.
