= Jaime Staples =

Canadian poker player (born 1991)

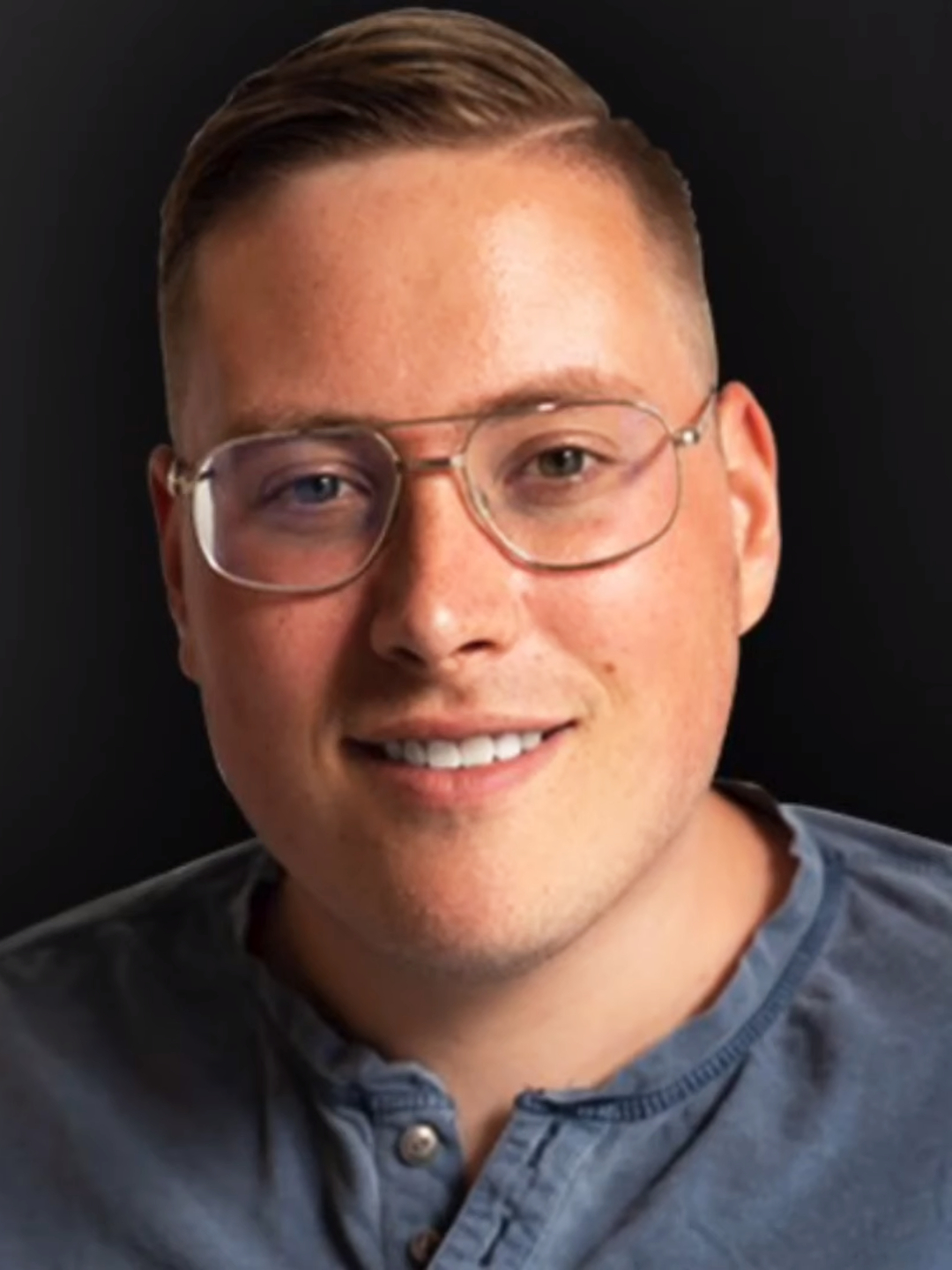
- Jaime Staples in 2018
- Born: May 27, 1991 (age 35); Calgary, Alberta, Canada

World Series of Poker
- Bracelet: 0
- Final table: None
- Money finishes: 2

European Poker Tour
- Money finish: 1

Jaime Staples (born May 27, 1991) is a poker player from Alberta, Canada who specializes in live streaming of online multi-table tournaments on Twitch. With over 150,000 followers on Twitch, Jaime is one of the most popular poker streamers. He primarily plays on Party Poker, becoming a PartyPoker Pro on May 4, 2019. Jaime was previously sponsored by rivals Poker Stars, but moved as it gave him the opportunity to make a "better and more positive impact on the online poker community".

Staples first entered the public eye in 2011, as a guest on the Badugi All-Stars podcast. In September 2016, Staples moved from his home city of Calgary, Alberta, then to Montreal, Quebec, along with his brother Matt and his good friend, Big Brother Canada contestant Kevin Martin. All three stream poker regularly on Twitch. Jaime has streamed from various locations around the world, including Canada, Croatia, Wales, British Virgin Islands, Costa Rica, Germany, Scotland, England, Iceland and Malta. He is currently streaming from Montreal.

As of 2024, his online tournament cashes exceed $150,000. Jaime concentrates on streaming and playing online, rather than live tournaments.

== Personal life ==
In August 2016, he began daily vlogging, documenting various minutiae of life as a poker player, as well as his attempts to lose weight and quit smoking.

Jaime is the oldest of four Staples siblings; Chris, Matt and Amy. On March 25, 2018, Jamie and his brother Matt won a $150,000 prop bet with Bill Perkins by weighing within one pound of each other precisely a year after the commencement of the bet.

They later bet $50,000 at 3:1 odds to get below 10% body fat, which was unsuccessful.

Jaime got engaged to his long term girlfriend, Rebecca Hardisty, on November 22, 2018. Jaime and Rebecca met due to their shared love of online poker.
