= Stapleford =

Stapleford may refer to:

== Places ==
=== England ===
- Stapleford, Cambridgeshire
- Stapleford, Hampshire
- Stapleford, Hertfordshire
- Stapleford, Leicestershire
  - Stapleford Miniature Railway
- Stapleford, Lincolnshire
- Stapleford, Nottinghamshire
  - Stapleford Rural District
- Stapleford, Wiltshire
- Stapleford Abbotts, Essex
- Stapleford Tawney, Essex
  - Stapleford Aerodrome

=== Elsewhere ===
- Stapleford, Zimbabwe

== People ==
- Harvey Stapleford (1912-1983), Canadian ice hockey player and coach
- Sally-Anne Stapleford (born 1945), English figure skater, administrator, referee and judge

== See also ==
- Bruen Stapleford, Cheshire
- Stableford (disambiguation)
