= Staple financing =

The term staple financing describes a form of investment banks pre-arranged financing package offered to potential bidders during an acquisition.
