= Staples Pond =

- Location within Maine Location within the United States
- Location: Temple, Maine
- Coordinates: 44°43′15″N 70°14′5″W
- Type: Mesotrophic, reservoir
- Primary outflows: Temple Stream
- Catchment area: 1.4 square miles (3.6 km^{2})
- Basin countries: United States
- Surface area: 56 acres (23 ha)
- Average depth: 23 feet (7.0 m)
- Max. depth: 44 feet (13 m)
- Water volume: 1,133 acre⋅ft (1,398,000 m^{3})
- Residence time: 8.2 months
- Shore length^{1}: 1.6 miles (2.6 km)
- Surface elevation: 704 feet (215 m)
- ^{1} Shore length is not a well-defined measure.

Staples Pond is located in the town of Temple, Maine, in the United States. Some locals prefer to call it "Santa Claus Lake", because of its appearance from the air. Water from Staples Pond flows via Temple Stream to the Sandy River in Farmington, and thence to the Kennebec River.
