= Staple Hill =

Staple Hill is the name of three places in England:

- Staple Hill, Gloucestershire, suburb of Bristol with ward status, and small hill
- Staple Hill, Somerset, a 315 m ridge in the Blackdown Hills largely within Staple Fitzpaine
- Staple Hill, Chobham Common, Chobham, Surrey, a hill
