= Competition Stableford Adjustment =

In golf, Competition Stableford Adjustment (CSA) is a method used to adjust a player's score at the end of a round before calculating any handicap adjustments. Its purpose is to compensate for occasions when scores deviate significantly from the expected average under normal conditions.

Using CSA, players can be added 1, 2 or 3 or subtracted 1 Stableford points to/from their score, which then affects how much their handicap is modified after the competition. The amount of the adjustment is determined by calculating how many players performed much better or much worse compared to their ability, measured as a percentage of all competitors, and then comparing to appropriate tables published by the relevant golf association. Points may be added when scoring is difficult because of bad weather or condition of the course, or conversely a point may be subtracted on days that conditions are particularly favorable for producing good scores. Despite its name, CSA can be applied in all types of stroke play, though the points need to be converted in Stableford format beforehand.

CSA was formerly a component of the EGA Handicap System. It was replaced by Computed Buffer Adjustment (CBA), which moves the handicap buffer zone instead of adjusting the player's score, in 2013.
