= Bill Roorbach =

American novelist

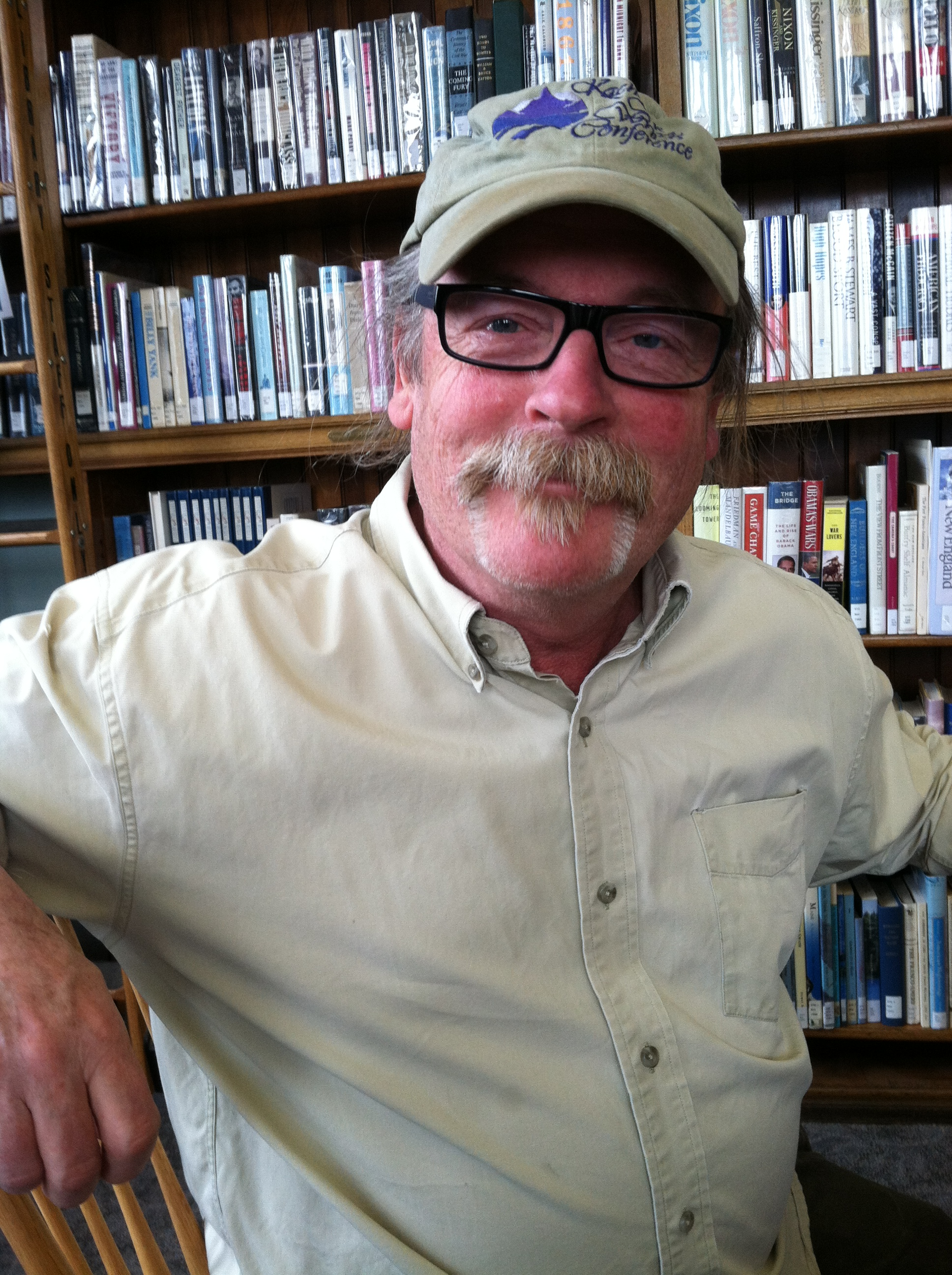
- Born: William Roorbach; August 8, 1953 (age 73); Chicago, Illinois, U.S.
- Education: Ithaca College (BA); Columbia University
- Occupations: Novelist; short story writer; memoirist; nature writer; journalist; blogger; critic
- Writing career
- Notable works: Big Bend; Life Among Giants

William Roorbach (born August 8, 1953) is an American novelist, short story and nature writer, memoirist, journalist, blogger and critic. He has authored fiction and nonfiction works including Big Bend, which won the Flannery O'Connor Award for Short Fiction and the O. Henry Prize. Roorbach's memoir in nature, Temple Stream, won the Maine Literary Award for Nonfiction, 2005. His novel, Life Among Giants, won the 2013 Maine Literary Award for Fiction.^{[18]} And The Remedy for Love, also a novel, was one of six finalists for the 2014 Kirkus Fiction Prize. His book, The Girl of the Lake, is a short story collection published in June 2017. His most recent novel is Lucky Turtle, published in 2022.

== Background ==
Bill Roorbach was born in 1953 in Chicago, Illinois. The next year, his family moved to suburban Boston, Massachusetts, where he attended kindergarten. In 1959 the family moved to New Canaan, Connecticut, where he attended public schools from first grade on, graduating from New Canaan High School in 1971. In 1976, he was graduated from Ithaca College cum laude with a B.A. in Individual and Interdisciplinary Studies.

During what he has called his "writing apprenticeship," Roorbach traveled and worked a series of different jobs. He played piano and sang in a succession of bands, bartended, worked briefly on a cattle ranch, and worked extensively as a carpenter, plumber, and handyman. In January, 1987, he enrolled in the Master of Fine Arts Writing Program of the Columbia University Graduate School of the Arts, where he was awarded a School of the Arts Fellowship, a Fellowship of Distinction and an English Department teaching assistantship. In addition, he was a fiction editor of "Columbia: A Magazine of Poetry and Prose." He was graduated in May 1990.

Roorbach and his wife, painter Juliet Karelsen, have one daughter.

== Academic career ==
Roorbach taught at the University of Maine at Farmington from 1991 to 1995 and subsequently at the Ohio State University from 1995 to 2001, winning tenure in 1998. In 2001, he quit his tenured position and returned with his family to Maine where he taught odd semesters as visiting full professor at Colby College. He wrote full-time until Fall, 2004, when he was awarded the William H.P. Jenks Chair of Contemporary American Letters at the College of the Holy Cross in Worcester, Massachusetts, a five-year position as full professor. He commuted from Maine to Worcester until April, 2009, when he returned to full-time writing. In the winter of 2019 Roorbach returned to teaching as a faculty member of the Newport MFA in creative writing at Salve Regina College.

== Work ==
Roorbach sold his first book. Summers with Juliet, to Houghton Mifflin shortly after graduating from Columbia. In 1998, he published Writing Life Stories. During the interim, he published short work, both fiction and nonfiction, in a number of magazines and journals, including The New York Times Magazine, The Atlantic Monthly, Harper's Magazine, Playboy, The Missouri Review, and Granta,. His first novel, The Smallest Color, a collection of stories, Big Bend, and a collection of essays, Into Woods, written incrementally during the preceding decade, were published in a flurry in 2000 and 2001. Big Bend was featured on the NPR program Selected Shorts, performed by the actor James Cromwell. Contemporary Creative Nonfiction: The Art of Truth, a widely adopted anthology, was published in 2002 by Oxford University Press. In 2004, A Place on Water, which Bill wrote with poet Wesley McNair and essayist Robert Kimber was published by Tilbury House, a craft publisher in Maine. In 2005, the Dial Press (RandomHouse) published Bill's book Temple Stream: A Rural Odyssey, which was based on Bill's article of the same name in Harper's Magazine and won the Maine Literary Award in 2005. Roorbach's novel, Life Among Giants, won the 2013 Maine Literary Award for Fiction.^{[18]} And The Remedy for Love, also a novel, was one of six finalists for the 2014 Kirkus Fiction Prize. His book, The Girl of the Lake, is a short story collection published in June 2017. His novel, Lucky Turtle, was published in 2022.

== Awards ==
- 2018 Civitella Ranieri Foundation Fellow, Umbria
- 2014 Kirkus Prize Finalist
- 2013 Maine Literary Award for Fiction
- 2006 Maine Prize for Literary Nonfiction
- 2004-2009 William H.P. Jenks Chair in Contemporary Letters, College of the Holy Cross
- 2004 Kaplan Foundation Fellow
- 2002 O. Henry Prize
- 2001 Flannery O'Connor Award for Short Fiction
- 1999 National Endowment for the Arts Fellow

== Bibliography ==
=== Novels ===
- The Smallest Color: A Novel. Counterpoint Press. 2001. ISBN 978-1-58243-252-6. "Bill Roorbach." (paperback 2003)
- Life Among Giants. Algonquin. 2012. ISBN 978-1-61620-076-3.
- The Remedy for Love. Algonquin. 2014. ISBN 978-1-61620-478-5.
- Lucky Turtle. Algonquin. 2022. ISBN 978-1-64375-390-4.
- Beep. Algonquin. 2024. ISBN 978-1-64375-561-8.

=== Nonfiction ===
- Summers with Juliet. Houghton Mifflin Harcourt Publishing Company. 1992. ISBN 978-0-3955-7323-5. "editions:FCCEYCrdOpMC." (paperback: Ohio State University Press, 2000)
- Writing Life Stories: How to Make Memories into Memoirs, Ideas into Essays, and Life into Literature. Writer's Digest Books. 2000. ISBN 978-1-884910-47-0.
- Into Woods: Essays. University of Notre Dame Press. 2002. ISBN 978-0-268-03162-6.(Reissue in Paperback: Down East Books, 2015)
- A Place on Water. Tilbury House. 2004. ISBN 978-0-884-48262-8.(Paperback: Down East Books, 2015)
- Temple Stream: A Rural Odyssey. Dial Press. 2005. ISBN 978-0-385-33654-3.(Reissued by Downeast Books, 2014)

=== Short story collections ===
- Big Bend: Short Stories. University of Georgia Press. 2001. ISBN 978-1-58243-257-1. (paperback: Counterpoint Press, 2003 )
- The Girl of the Lake. Algonquin. 2017. ISBN 978-1-61620-332-0.

=== Short stories ===
- "Harbinger Hall" published in The Atlantic, December 2004; also included in The Girl of the Lake
- Kiva—First appeared under the title "Investigation" in Iron Horse.
- "The Fall"
- "Murder Cottage"—Originally published in the short story collection, The Girl of The Lake The Girl of the Lake. Algonquin. 2017. ISBN 978-1-61620-332-0..
- "Princesa"—First appeared in the Missouri Review.
- "Broadax, Inc."—First appeared in Ecotone.
- "The Tragedie of King Lear"—Originally published in the short story collection, The Girl of The Lake The Girl of the Lake. Algonquin. 2017. ISBN 978-1-61620-332-0..
- "Some Should"
- "Dung Beetle"
- "The Girl of the Lake"—First appeared in Ecotone.

=== Anthologies ===
- Contemporary Creative Nonfiction: The Art of Truth. Oxford University Press. 2001. ISBN 978-0-195-13556-5.

=== Essays ===
- Where the Hat Is. Decor Maine. 2018.

== Interviews ==
- Secret Passages "NY Times Book Review of Life Among Giants by Bill Roorbach", NY Times, February 22, 2013]
- Bob Edwards - Bill Roorbach "Bob Edwards Interviews Bill Roorbach about Life Among Giants"]
