= Stableford =

Scoring system in golf

Stableford is a scoring system used in the sport of golf. Rather than counting the total number of strokes taken, as in regular stroke play, it involves scoring points based on the number of strokes taken at each hole. Unlike traditional scoring methods, where the aim is to have the lowest score, under Stableford rules, the objective is to have the highest score.

The Stableford system was developed by Frank Barney Gorton Stableford (1870–1959), to deter golfers from giving up on their round after just one or two bad holes. It was first used informally at the Glamorganshire Golf Club, Penarth, Wales, in 1898, and first used in competition at Wallasey Golf Club in Wallasey, England, in 1932. Between his membership of the Glamorganshire and Wallasey Golf Clubs, Stableford was a member at Anglesey Golf Club North Wales, for most of the 1920s.

Stableford can have the added benefit of speeding up the pace of play, as once it is no longer possible to score a point, players do not have to complete the hole but can simply pick up their ball and proceed to the next hole. It is a popular form of the game, especially at club level and particularly in the United Kingdom, as it is still possible to record a competitive score despite having the occasional bad hole.

== Scoring ==
The number of points awarded on each hole is determined based on comparison of the number of strokes taken to a fixed score, usually par. This fixed score is then adjusted in relation to the player's handicap. Once players have taken two strokes more than the adjusted fixed score, they may abandon the hole and move on to the next, as it is then not possible to score any points on that hole. Because of this, it is still possible to be competitive even allowing for a few bad holes. At the end of the round, the number of points scored on each hole is totaled to give a final score. The winner of a Stableford competition is the player with the highest point total. Final scores may be modified for all players using the Competition Stableford Adjustment system.

In the United Kingdom, the fixed score would be adjusted as per the stroke indexes (SI) of the holes, starting at the lowest stroke index 1 hole, through to the highest, stroke index 18. For example, a 12 handicap golfer would increase the fixed score on holes indexed 1 through 12, a 24 handicap player would increase the score by two on holes indexed 1 through 6 and by one for the rest, and a plus handicap player would reduce the fixed scores starting at the stroke index 18 hole.

The number of points awarded per hole as specified by The R&A and the United States Golf Association are as follows:

Points	Strokes taken in relation to adjusted fixed score
0	2 strokes or more over, or no score recorded
1	1 stroke over
2	Same number of strokes
3	1 stroke under
4	2 strokes under
5	3 strokes under
6	4 strokes under

This linear scoring version of Stableford is mathematically equivalent to traditional stroke play but with the maximum score for each hole capped at a double bogey.

=== Modified Stableford ===
The standard Stableford system can be altered to use different point levels, commonly referred to as a Modified Stableford system. It is a maximum score system. For example, in professional golf, the following scoring table has been used at the Barracuda Championship on the PGA Tour.

Points	Strokes taken in relation to par
+8	Albatross (3 strokes under par)
+5	Eagle (2 strokes under par)
+2	Birdie (1 stroke under par)
0	Par
−1	Bogey (1 stroke over par)
−3	Double bogey or worse (2 strokes or more over par)

This points scale encourages aggressive play, since the reward for scoring under par is higher than the penalty for scoring over par. The maximum score is two strokes over par; once a player has made his shot and is one stroke over par, he may concede, pick up the ball, take a double bogey, and proceed to the next hole without penalty.

== Professional tournaments ==
Very few professional tournaments have used a Stableford scoring system.

The first PGA Tour event that used a Stableford system of scoring was The International in Colorado, although it used a modified version of the scoring system adapted for the skill levels of the professionals and to encourage attacking play. The event was cancelled in February 2007, after 21 years as part of the tour. The modified Stableford system returned to the PGA Tour at the Reno-Tahoe Open in 2012. Both events were held at high elevation.

On the European Tour, the ANZ Championship, which ran for three years from 2002, used the same modified Stableford scoring system as The International. The Investec Royal Swazi Open on the Sunshine Tour has used the same system since 2003. Two Champions Tour events also used the modified Stableford system briefly. They were the Royal Caribbean Classic in 2000 and 2001, and the Uniting Fore Care Classic in 2002. In the latter case, it was seen as a final attempt to save the failing tournament.

The American Century Championship, a celebrity tournament played at Edgewood Tahoe Golf Course in Stateline, Nevada, has used a modified Stableford scoring format since 2004. It is also at high elevation.

The Diamond Resorts Tournament of Champions Celebrity Division, part of the LPGA season opening event, has its celebrities participating in a modified Stableford system. The maximum score is double bogey.

Points	Strokes taken in relation to fixed score
0	Fixed score (double bogey)
1	One stroke under (bogey)
2	Two strokes under (par)
3	Three strokes under (birdie)
5	Four strokes under, Par 4 or 5 (eagle)
8	Hole in one on Par 3
10	Five strokes under fixed score (albatross)

== See also ==
- Competition Stableford Adjustment
- Variations of golf
