= William R. Staples =

American judge (1798–1868)

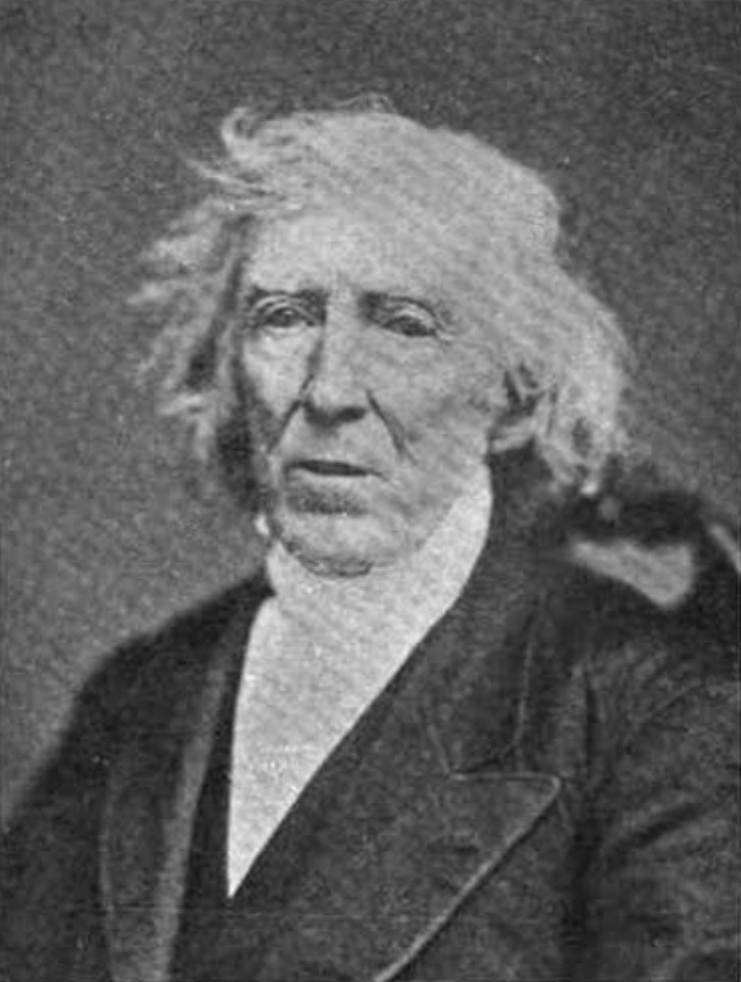
Rhode Island Supreme Court Justice William R. Staples, from The Green Bag (1890).

William R. Staples (1798–1868) was a justice of the Rhode Island Supreme Court from June 1835 to March 7, 1856, serving as Chief Justice after 1854.

Born in Providence, Rhode Island, Staples graduated from Brown University in 1817, and was admitted to the bar in 1819.

In 1832 he was a member of the Common Council of Providence, and later served for two years as Justice of the Police Court. From 1835 to 1854 he was an associate justice of the Supreme Court. While serving on the court, he engaged in historical studies and antiquarian research. In 1843 he published his Annals of Providence, a history of the city from its founding until 1832. He was the author and compiler of several works upon subjects connected with the early history of Rhode Island. At the request of the General Assembly, he prepared a history of the State Convention of 1790 which adopted the Federal Constitution. After the resignation of Chief Justice Richard W. Greene in 1854, Staples was elected chief justice. After holding the office for two years, he resigned as of March 7, 1856, due to health issues.

He wrote few reported opinions, most of which were very short, and are mainly brief statements of the conclusions reached by the court rather than elaborate statements of the reasons upon which the decision rested.

Political offices
Preceded by Charles Brayton	Justice of the Rhode Island Supreme Court; 1835–1856	Succeeded by Samuel Ames
