= James Frederick Staples =

Australian jurist

The Honourable James Frederick Staples

Deputy President of the Australian Conciliation and Arbitration Commission
- In office 24 February 1975 – 1 March 1989
- Nominated by: Clyde Cameron
- Appointed by: Sir John Kerr

Personal details
- Born: James Frederick Staples; 2 June 1929 Sydney, New South Wales, Australia
- Died: 27 April 2016 (aged 86) Gloucester, New South Wales, Australia
- Resting place: Reedy Creek Cemetery; 32°28′40″S 151°20′04″E
- Party: Communist Party (1947–1956); Australian Labor Party
- Other political affiliations: NSW Council for Civil Liberties
- Spouse: Margot Staples (née Ungley) (m. 1966)
- Education: University of Sydney
- Occupation: Barrister, jurist

James Frederick Staples (2 June 1929 – 27 April 2016), better known as Jim Staples, or as Justice Staples in legal contexts, was an Australian judicial officer. He served as a deputy president of the Australian Conciliation and Arbitration Commission from 1975 until its dissolution in 1989.

== Early life ==
Staples was born in Sydney, New South Wales (NSW) on 2 June 1929, on the brink of the Great Depression. His father, a former First World War serviceman, died in 1933, forcing his mother to take up factory work to earn a living, and causing Staples to spend part of his childhood living with extended family away from his mother and two younger brothers.

== Education ==
Staples completed his secondary education at Canterbury Boys' High School. An enthusiastic student, he achieved statewide first place in Latin in the Leaving Certificate. This earned him a place at the University of Sydney, from which he graduated with a Bachelor of Arts in 1950 and a Bachelor of Laws in 1953.

=== Communist Party involvement ===
During his time at Sydney University, the young and idealistic Staples became a member of the Australian Communist Party. In 1951, he witnessed the High Court of Australia overturn the Menzies government's attempted ban of the party in Australian Communist Party v Commonwealth, an action which instilled in him the power of the judiciary to uphold civil liberties.

However, Staples’ involvement with the party did not last. A regular reader of the international edition of the New York Times, Staples was one of the first Australian communists to read the text of Nikita Khrushchev's revelationary secret speech denouncing Stalin when the Times published a leaked copy of it in June 1956. When the Australian Communist Party leadership refused to accept the veracity of the speech, Staples arranged to have 500 copies of it reprinted on a Gestetner owned by the NSW Deckhand's Union, complete with a cover designed by local artist Rod Shaw. For this action, Staples was soon after expelled from the party.

== Career ==
=== Early career ===
An early business partner of Staples was Gordon Barton, whom, despite their differing political affiliations, he became friends with while studying together at Sydney University. Unable to secure legal work at the time, they bought a truck together and started a transportation business. While Barton later grew this business into the multinational Ipec, Staples left it early on to pursue his legal career.

=== Barrister ===
Staples was admitted to the New South Wales Bar on 29 July 1960, and established his own law practice. Later in the 1960s he became a founding member NSW Council for Civil Liberties (CCL), which included prominent members of the NSW legal profession such as Maurice Byers and Neville Wran. Staples took on numerous briefs assigned to him by the CCL, many of them pro bono, advocating for freedoms in areas of human rights.

Staples also served for a time in the Commonwealth Attorney-General's Department. However, this career path was brought to an end when he was dismissed in 1968 on the advice of the Australian Security Intelligence Organisation, after they brought to light his prior membership of the Communist Party. At the time this was considered a potential security risk in light of the ongoing Cold War, a view later dismissed by contemporaries such as Jeffrey Miles.

==== Notable cases ====
Following the shooting by police of George Tartar in 1966, Staples assisted in gaining recommendations for improved governance of police firearms use from the coroner's jury investigating the event.

In 1971, Staples defended the two doctors who were accused in R v Wald, a District Court case which effectively legalised abortion in NSW. In constructing his argument for the case, Staples recalled the legal history of abortion back to the 16th century to argue for the lawfulness of the procedure.

While the Nagle Royal Commission into the state of the NSW prison system was being held from 1976 to 1978, Staples was chairing the prison reform committee of the CCL, in which role he amassed a collection of statutory declarations from prisoners detailing warden brutality. The royal commission subsequently made 252 recommendations.

=== Conciliation and Arbitration Commission ===
After having served as counsel to the national wage case during the Whitlam government, Staples became a federal judge when he was appointed to the Australian Conciliation and Arbitration Commission upon the nomination of the Minister for Labor and Immigration, Clyde Cameron, with effect from 24 February 1975. Here he joined fellow CCL member Michael Kirby, who had been appointed the previous December.

==== BHP and Seamen's case ====
Within a year of his appointment Staples had already stirred controversy. In a dispute between BHP and the Seamen's Union of Australia, he used an emotive turn of phrase to describe the disregarding of his prior recommendations by BHP:

'Let them [the recommendations], then, twist slowly, slowly in the wind, dead and despised, as a warning to the Commission of the limits of the persuasion of a public authority upon those who zealously uphold the privileges of property and who exercise the prerogatives of the master over those of our citizens whose lot falls to be their employees.'

Despite the subsequent successful resolution of the case by Staples, employer organisations accused him of partiality. The president of the commission, John Moore, reassigned Staples from the maritime panel of industries to an alternate panel, while also privately making representations to Cameron's ministerial successor, Jim McClelland, to appoint Staples elsewhere in order to 'maintain the harmony of the industrial club'. However, McClelland took no action on this before the Whitlam government was ended by a constitutional crisis in November 1975.

==== Overseas study tour ====
Under the subsequent Fraser government, Staples was dispatched on an overseas study tour during 1977 and 1978, ostensibly to investigate matters of human rights and civil liberties, but with the conspicuous side-effect that he was for nearly two years temporarily removed from his substantive duties at the commission. Staples produced several reports during this period, including an investigation of Canadian human rights law.

==== Return to Australia and withdrawal of assignments ====
Staples returned to Australia and his duties on the commission in 1979. One of his first acts upon returning was to award an unexpectedly large wage increase to Storemen and Packers Union, which was subsequently overturned on appeal by the full bench of the commission amid union strikes in protest in February 1980. The next month, following critical comments made by Staples from the bench concerning the unwillingness of Telecom (then a commission of the Commonwealth) to negotiate with a union, the Fraser government arranged for Staples to be offered an appointment to the Australian Law Reform Commission in an apparent attempt to remove him from the arena of industrial relations. Staples declined the offer.

Instead, Staples made a defiant speech at a conference in Adelaide in which he defended his original ruling in the Storemen and Packers Union case and criticised its overturning by the full bench. This criticism concerned his fellow deputy presidents on the commission, who wrote to Moore expressing this view. Following receipt of this letter, and new appointments to the commission, Moore withdrew all of Staples' panel assignments in May 1980, leaving him to sit on the full bench as invited on a case-by-case basis only.

Days later, Mary Gaudron, a fellow deputy president and future High Court justice, resigned her position, expressing her disappointment to Moore that the letter which she had signed had been used in a way which she had not intended. At the same time, the move was criticised by eleven members of the NSW Bar in an open letter to The Sydney Morning Herald as 'an attack on judicial integrity and independence'. However, when Staples sought the support of the NSW Bar Association to challenge Moore's decision, an extraordinary general meeting of the association resolved not to take any action. Over the course of the next five years, the number of days in which Staples was invited to sit on the full bench of the commission declined. Eventually, they ceased altogether once Barry Maddern, who instituted a policy of ignoring Staples altogether, replaced Moore as the president of the commission in 1985.

==== Dissolution of the commission ====
Shortly after its election in 1983, the Hawke government commissioned Keith Hancock to review the full scope of the industrial relations system. The Hancock Report, handed down in 1985, included among its recommendations replacing the Conciliation and Arbitration Commission with a new Australian Industrial Relations Commission (AIRC). This was duly implemented through the Industrial Relations Act 1988 (Cth) and Industrial Relations (Consequential Provisions) Act 1988 (Cth). In January 1989, the new Minister for Industrial Relations Peter Morris appointed Maddern to be president of the new AIRC, and each of the outgoing deputy presidents of the Conciliation and Arbitration Commission as deputy presidents of the AIRC, with the sole exception of Staples. Thus, when the new AIRC replaced the former commission on 1 March 1989, Staples effectively ceased to be a federal judge through the abolition of his office, and by the transitional and savings provisions of the enabling legislation he was legally deemed to be of pensionable age, despite not yet being sixty as ordinarily required.

===== Controversy =====
Leading up to 1 March 1989, the Hawke government was accused in the press and in legal circles of subverting judicial independence by annulling Staples' security of tenure. On the day of the transition, Prime Minister Bob Hawke was forced to defend the decision not to reappoint Staples in parliamentary question time. He described his government's action as remedying the 'unsatisfactory' and 'increasingly intolerable' situation of Staples having no work to do, for which he held the successive presidents of the commission responsible. Furthermore, he disputed that the commission represented a judicial body. For his part, Staples gave a vigorous rebuttal and a broader defence of his actions on the commission at a National Press Club address a few weeks later on 23 March.

A joint select committee of parliament was instigated to investigate the tenure of appointments to Commonwealth tribunals. It first met in April 1989, and reported in November 1989, having dedicated a chapter of its report to the Staples matter. It found that Staples had been 'at all times prepared to carry out the duties of his office but was prevented from doing so by decisions of the President of the day', and expressed surprise that a resolution to the issue had not been arrived at between Staples and the president during the prior decade.

===== Aftermath =====
Although a High Court challenge had been mooted in the press, Staples ultimately chose not to challenge his loss of office in court, and the controversy subsided. The events have since been studied as an example of the limits of judicial independence, especially by Michael Kirby, Staples' former colleague on the commission and later High Court justice. The events continued to be cited as an example of Australian government intervention in the adjudication of industrial relations even after Staples' death.

=== Retirement ===
In his retirement, Staples became a director of Civil Liberties Australia, building upon his longstanding membership of the NSW Council for Civil Liberties.

== Personal life ==
In 1966, Staples married Margot Staples (née Ungley), a potter who served as president the Potter's Society of Australia. They lived together in Longueville on the North Shore of Sydney.

Staples also lived in Bywong, a rural community not far from Canberra, and Gloucester, in the hinterland of the Mid North Coast of NSW, where he died on 27 April 2016. He is buried at Reedy Creek Cemetery in the Hunter Valley.
